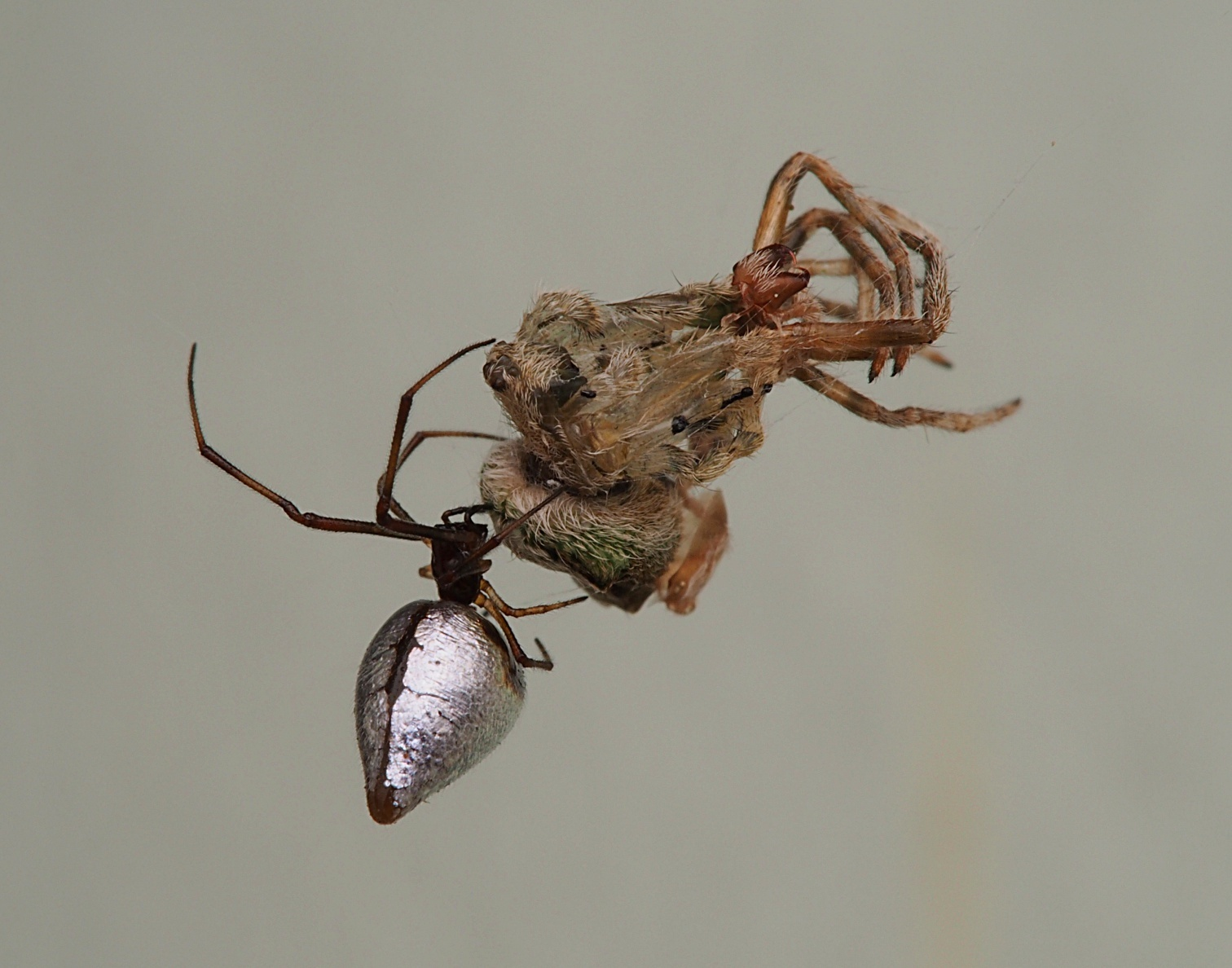

Scientific classification
- Domain: Eukaryota
- Kingdom: Animalia
- Phylum: Arthropoda
- Subphylum: Chelicerata
- Class: Arachnida
- Order: Araneae
- Infraorder: Araneomorphae
- Family: Theridiidae
- Genus: Argyrodes
- Species: A. antipodianus

Binomial name
- Argyrodes antipodianus O. P-Cambridge, 1880

Synonyms
- Argyrodes antipodiana O.P-Cambridge,1880; Argyrodes conus Urquhart,1885

= Argyrodes antipodianus =

Dew drop spider

Species of spider

Argyrodes antipodianus, also known as the dew drop spider, is a species of kleptoparasitic spider from the cobweb spider family found in Australia, New Zealand and New Caledonia.

== Taxonomy ==
Argyrodes antipodianus was first described in 1880 by Octavius Pickard-Cambridge as A. antipodiana from samples collected from Sydney and New Zealand by Frederick Hutton. A. antipodianus was independently described again in 1885 as Argyrodes conus by Arthur Urquhart. In 1917, Raymond de Dalmas provided an updated description of A. antipodiana, changed its name to A. antipodianus (although it is unclear why) and recognized A. conus as a synonym of A. antipodianus. A. antipodianus was provided updated descriptions in 1924 and 1999.

== Description ==
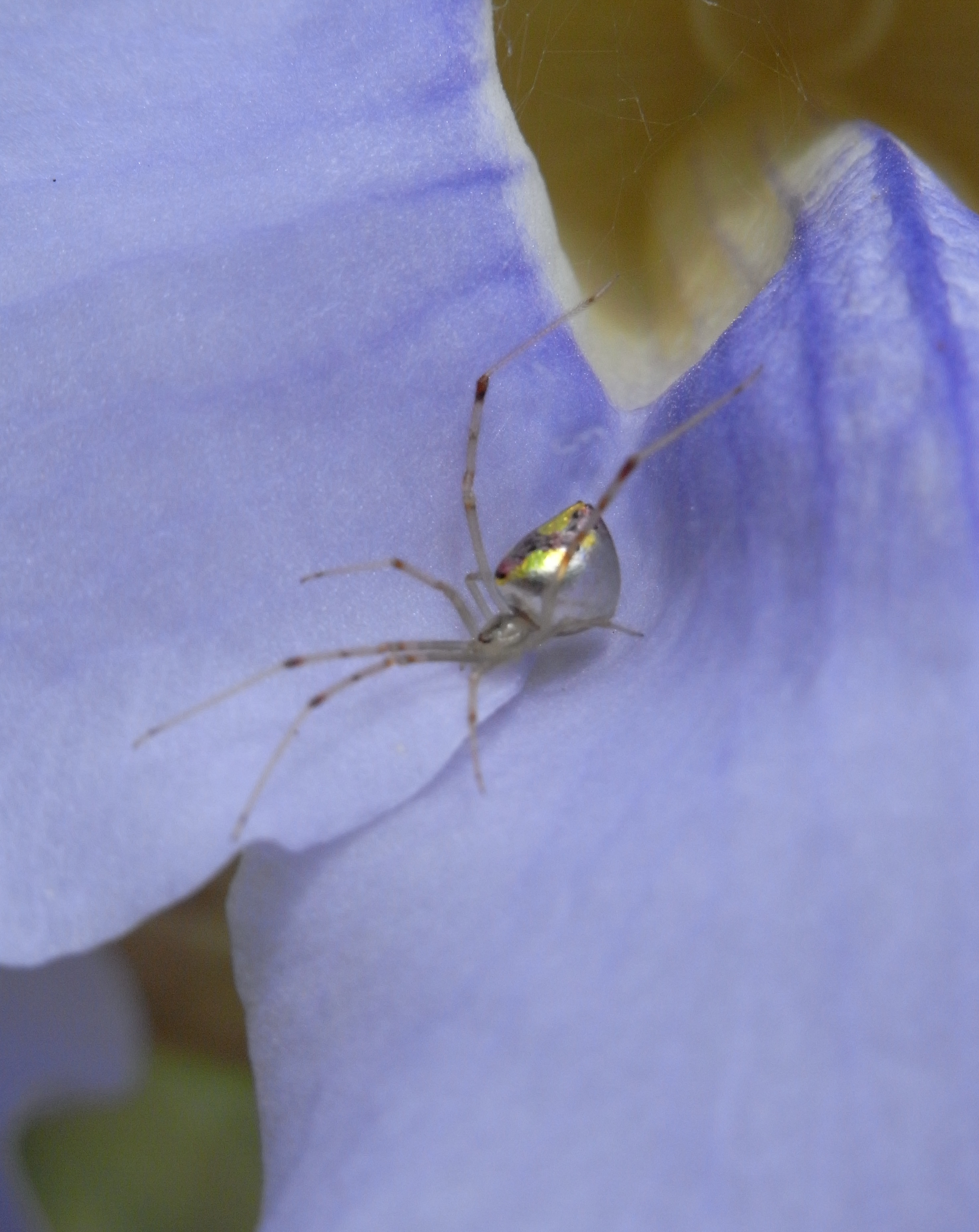
Argyrodes antipodianus in a flower

Argyrodes antipodianus are generally between 2-3mm in length, with some variation between sexes and individuals. The carapace and legs are a dark brown colour whereas the abdomen is a striking bright silver colour (hence the "dew drop spider" common name) and has a conical shape.

== Distribution and habitat ==
Argyrodes antipodianus is known to occur in Eastern Australia, New Caledonia and most of New Zealand. These spiders do not occur in the southern half of the South Island of New Zealand. It has been proposed that this absence is due to their preference for warmer habitats.

== Behaviour ==
Argyrodes antipodianus live on the webs of orbweaver spiders, with whom they have a kleptoparasitic relationship. Whilst living on the webs of the orbweaver spiders, A. antipodianus steals smaller prey items from the larger spiders, often to their detriment. One such spider that A. antipodianus co-occurs with is Nephila plumipes. A study found that the kleptoparasitic relationship between these two species resulted in N. plumipes gaining weight at a slower rate and relocating its web more frequently than individuals of the same species who were not being hindered by these spiders.

The host spider may kill A. antipodianus if it is detected. To avoid this, A. antipodianus builds a "support web" which allows the spider to move without the host detecting its presence. Using support webs, the spider can move around almost freely and will steal food bundles and may even feed on prey the same time the host is feeding on it.

=== Known hosts ===
Some known hosts of A. antipodianus includes:

- Araneus dimidiatus
- Argiope
- Cyrtophora
- Cyrtophora hirta
- Cyrtophora moluccensis
- Eriophora transmarina
- Eriophora pustulosa
- Gasteracantha
- Leucauge
- Nephila plumipes
- Nephila pilipes
- Nephilengys
- Plebs eburnus (syn. Araneus eburnus)
