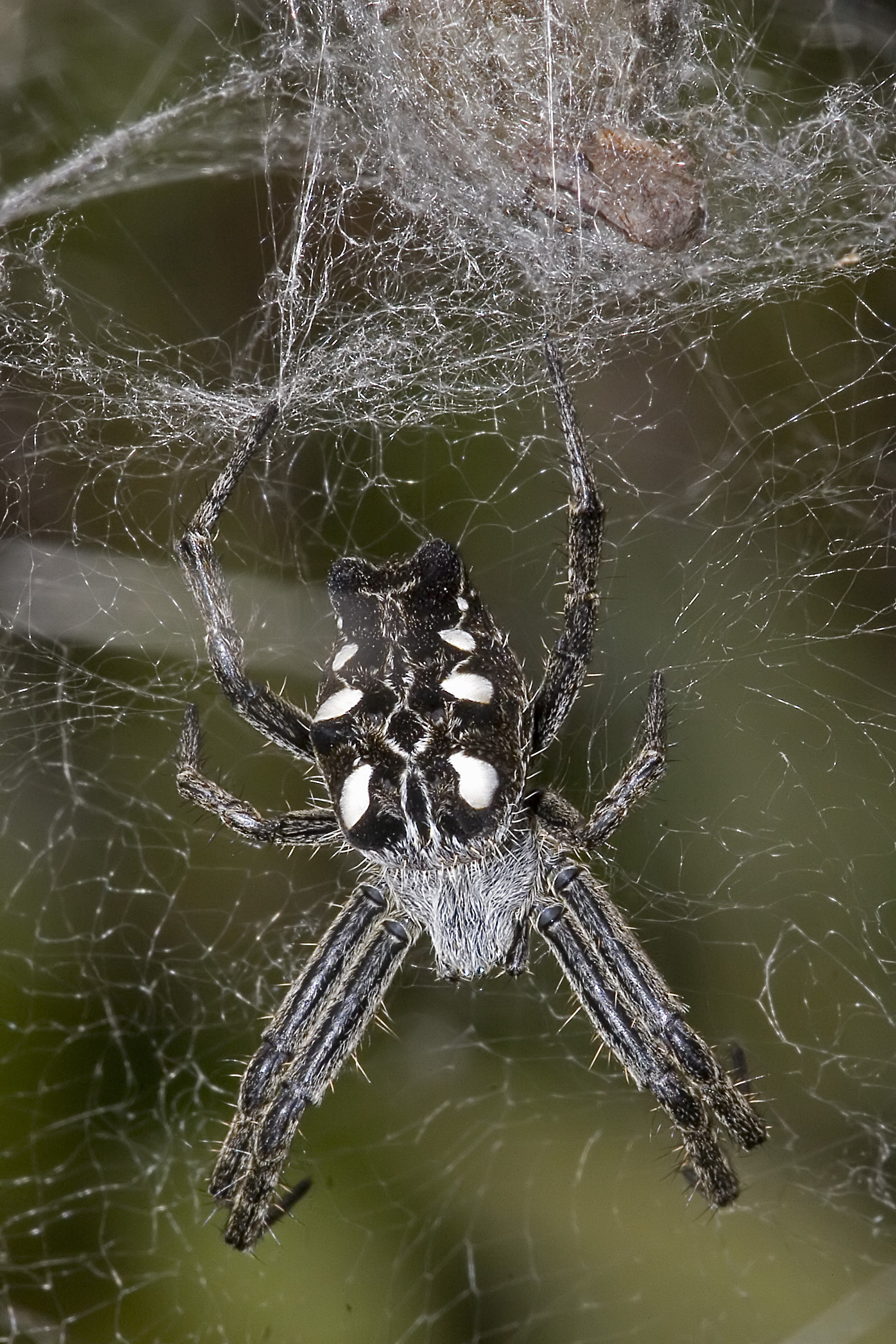
- C. citricola from Portugal
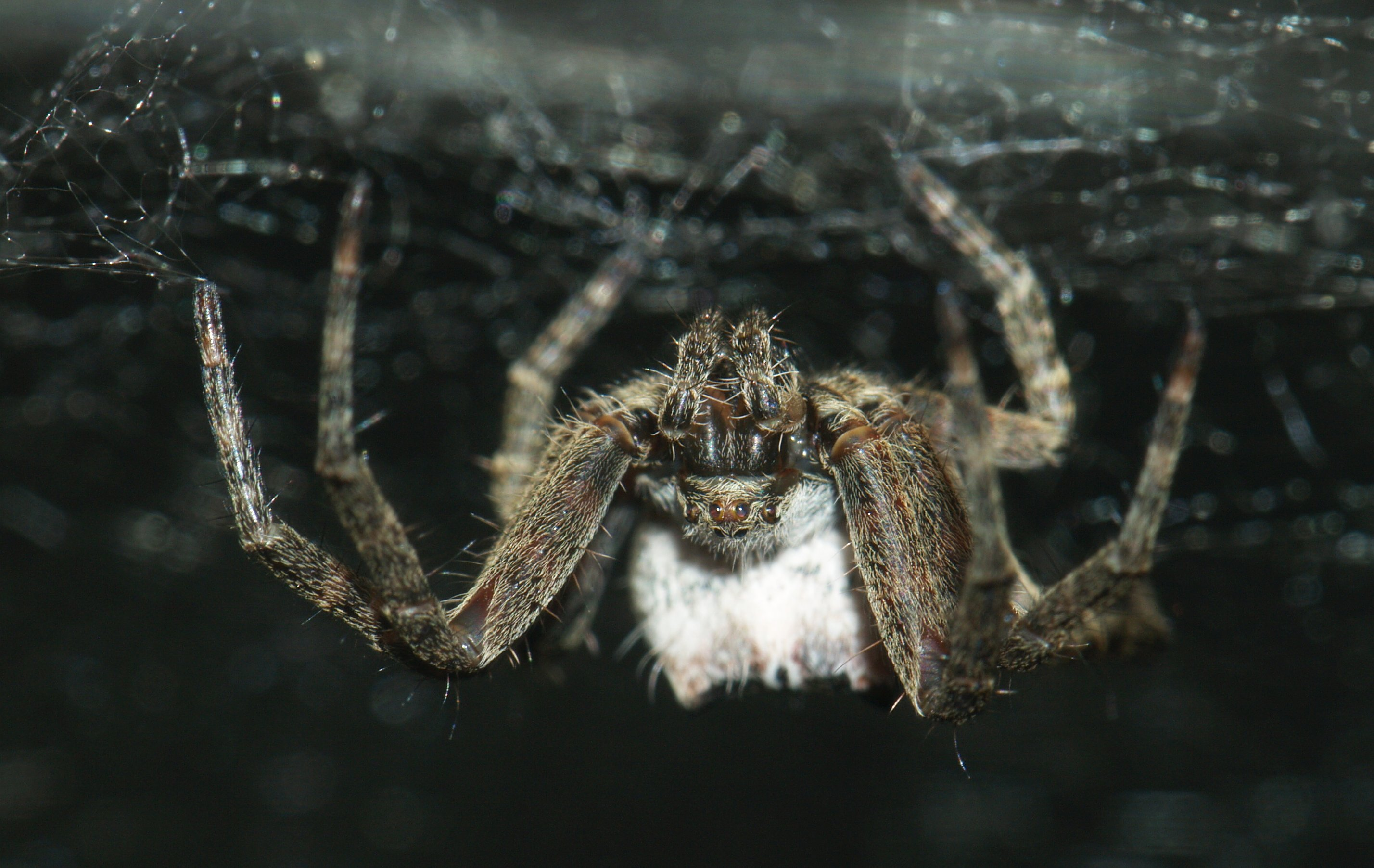
- Female in web

Scientific classification
- Kingdom: Animalia
- Phylum: Arthropoda
- Subphylum: Chelicerata
- Class: Arachnida
- Order: Araneae
- Infraorder: Araneomorphae
- Family: Araneidae
- Genus: Cyrtophora
- Species: C. citricola

Binomial name
- Cyrtophora citricola (Forskål, 1775)

= Cyrtophora citricola =

Tropical Tent-web spider

Species of spider

Cyrtophora citricola, also known as the tropical tent-web spider, is an orb-weaver spider in the family Araneidae. It is found in Asia, Africa, Australia, Costa Rica, Hispaniola, Colombia, and Southern Europe and in 2000, it was discovered in Florida. C. citricola differs from many of its close relatives due its ability to live in a wide variety of environments. In North America and South America, the spider has caused extensive damage to agricultural operations.

C. citricola is in the orb web spider family, but its orb webs are considered atypical. They have a thick silk strand barrier above the orb and a thinner barrier below the orb. This gives the webs a horizontal mesh-like appearance. The spider has developed distinct and specific prey-capturing techniques using its unconventional webs. The prey flies into the upper mesh layer of the web and is deflected into the orb web. The spider then collects and stores the prey in its web. The difference in C. citricola's web silk stems from physiological variations in its spinning apparatuses, as compared to other closely related species. Its webs are non-adhesive and do not require daily respinning.

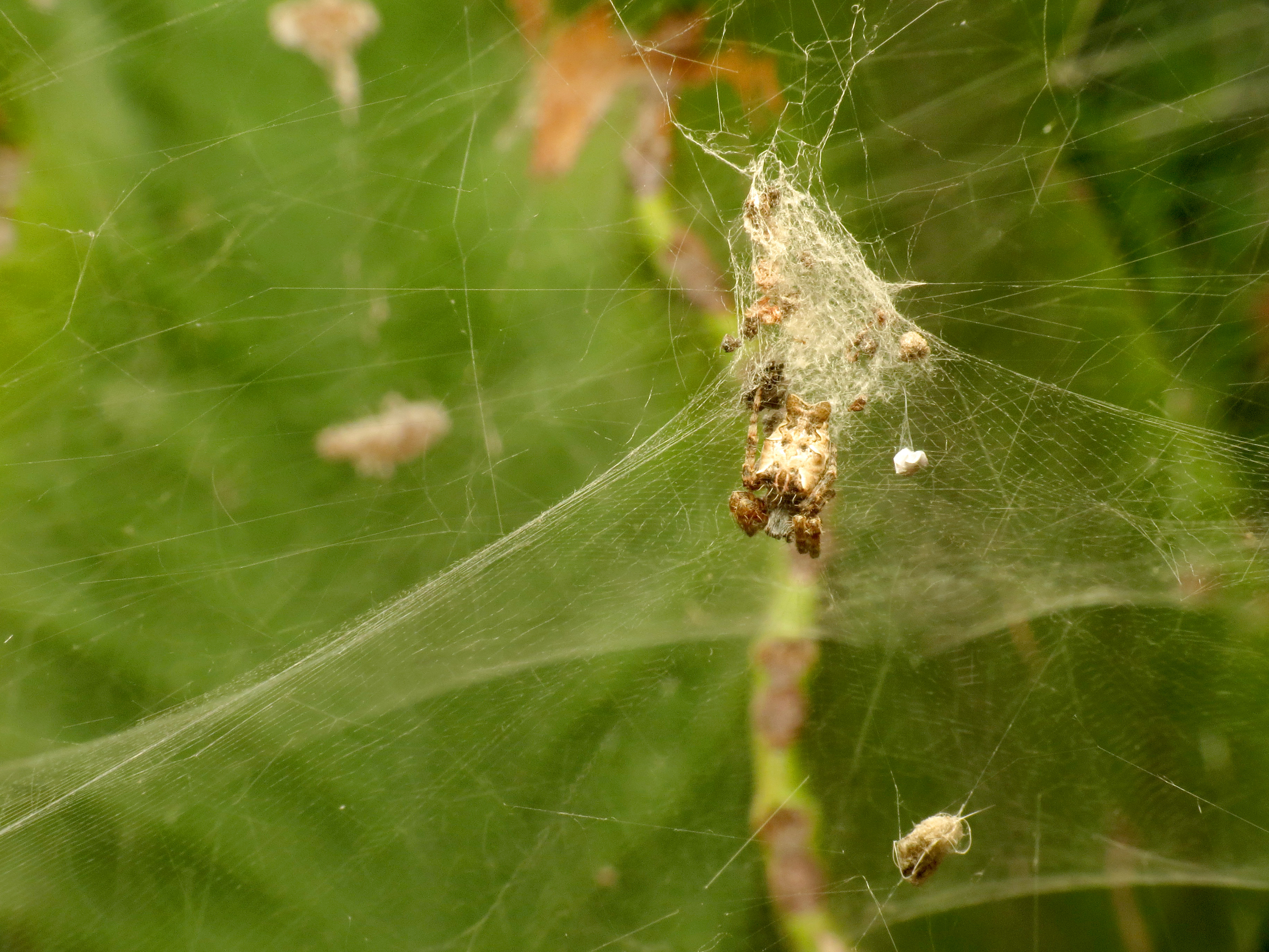
Tent web

This spider is one of the few species to exhibit a variable level of sociality. C. citricola can be seen in colonies, which may have arisen due to reduced predation. Within these colonies, each spider has its own web that is linked to other spiders through communal webbing. The spider webs are often built in large matrices next to one another and can span entire trees. The spider usually peacefully coexists with other spiders in the colony. However, at times the spider may have to ward off other spiders in the colony that may try and claim its web.

C. citricola is nocturnal, only performing necessary tasks during the day. During the day, it remains idle and tries to stay out of sight from predators. Most of its foraging and prey capture happen at night.

C. citricola's color and size can vary greatly. Many spiders sport a black and white pattern while others are brown. Males often appear black. Male and female spiders have a sexual dimorphism. The body length in females normally reaches 10 millimetres (0.39 in), while males are only 3 millimetres (0.12 in) long.

== Taxonomy ==
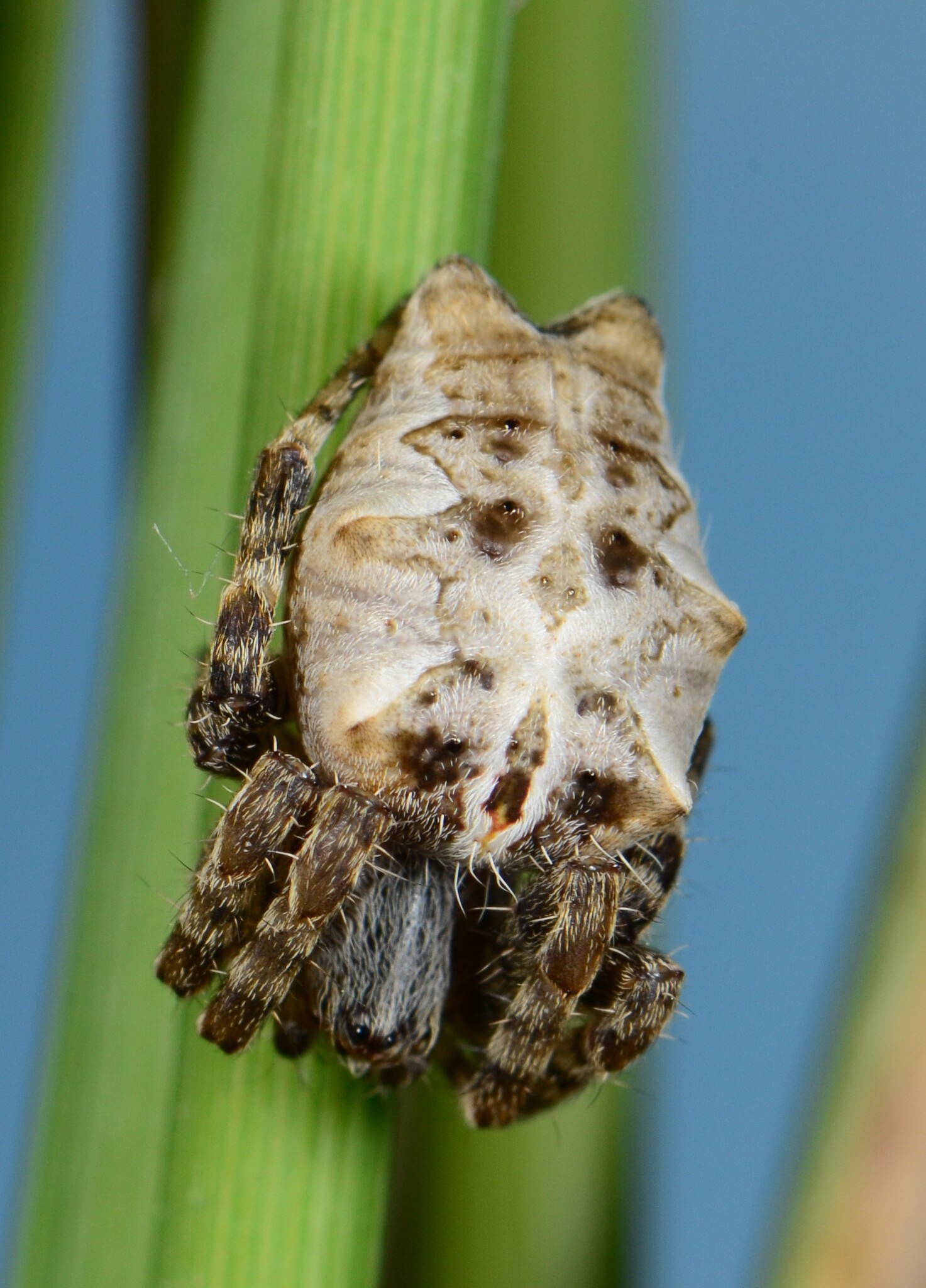
female from South Africa

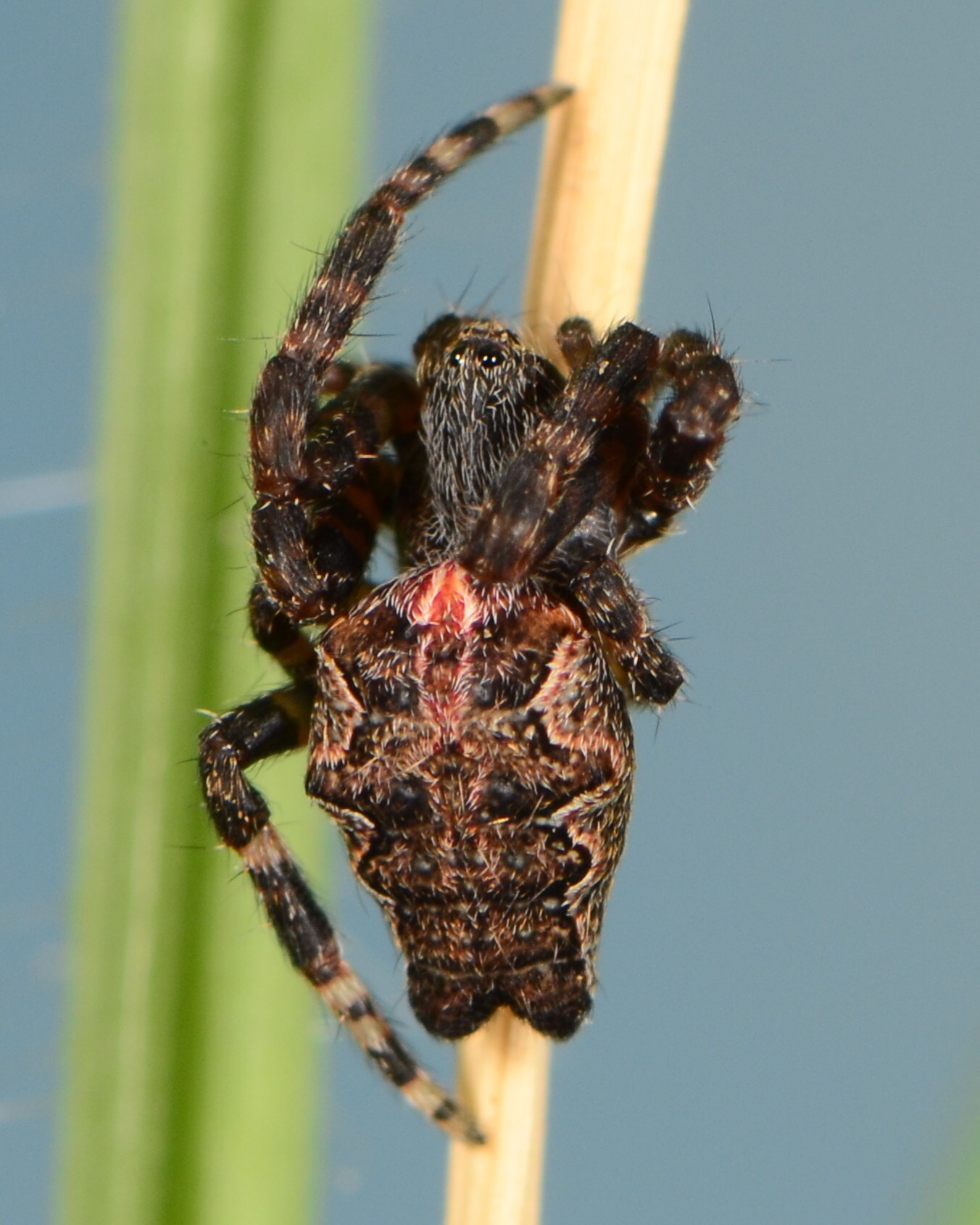
female from South Africa

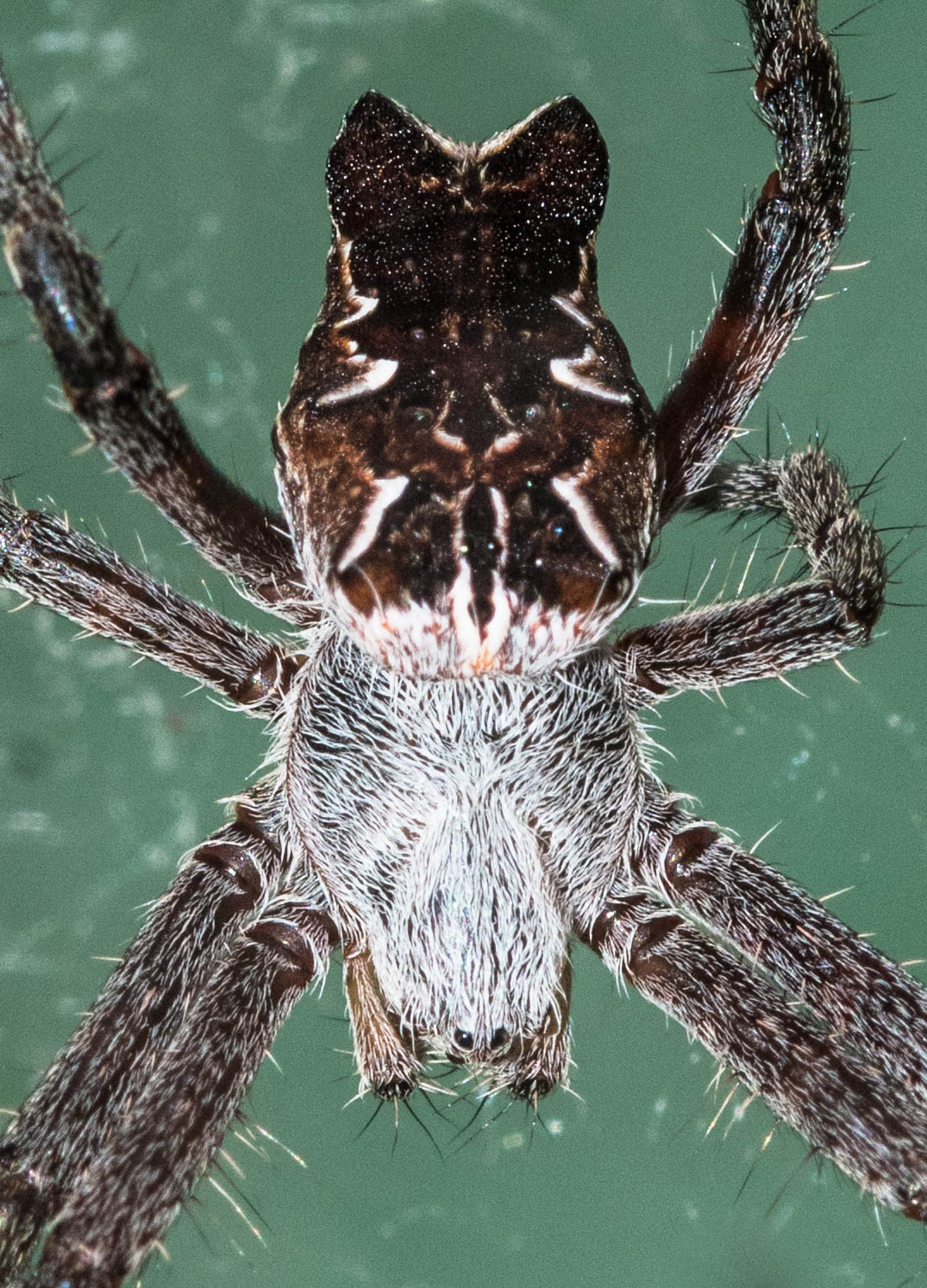

Peter Forsskal discovered Cyrtophora citricola in the Arabian Peninsula during his Yemen expedition, sometime between 1761 and 1763. He first saw the spiders in citrus trees and described their horizontal webs as nets. The spider's common name, "tropical tent-web", derives from these observations. Upon Forsskal's death of malaria in 1763, his manuscripts, which included details of the spider, were collected and sent from Yemen back to Denmark by his friend Carsten Niebuhr. These records were published in 1775 as Descriptiones animalium, avium, amphibiorum, piscium, insectorum, vermium; the spider appeared under the name Aranea citricola.

C. citricola was classified in the Araneidae family because it creates orb-webs. Between 1776 and 1864, the spider was classified under the genus Epeira, a synonym for Aranea, more commonly known as Araneus. The spider was moved from the genus Aranea to the genus Cyrtophora by Eugene Simon in 1864 – a decision made because its webs were so different from those constructed by other spiders in the genus Aranea. C. citricola webs are horizontal and tent-shaped, similar to those of other spiders in the genus Cyrtophora. Like other members of Cyrtophora, C. citricola's 2nd, 3rd, and 4th pairs of legs have a shorter combined patella and tibia length than the femurs on the same legs. Additionally, it shares the same eye pattern where the posterior eye row is recurved: a typical genus-defining trait. C. citricola has broader cephalic structures than other orb-web spiders in the genus Manogea.

=== Phylogeny ===
Cyrtophora citricola falls into the family Araneidae because of three characteristics. The male's palpal faces the mesial, or midline of the body. The male spider's palpal has an exoskeleton on their bulbous known as a radix, and the spider has a thin reflective layer of tissue in the posterior set of its eyes called the tapetum. C. citricola differs from "derived araneoids", which are a part of the superfamily Araneoidea, such as Theridion and Linyphiidae, because it lacks smaller aciniform spigots in their median spinnerets. These spigots each individually produce a strand of aciniform silk, the strongest type of spider silk.

C. citricola is a part of the argiopoid clade because there is a sexual dimorphism between males and females. Female are larger than males. The sexual dimorphism present in C. citricola separates them from members of the Araneinae subfamily including Nuctenea, Cyclosa, and Mangora. C. citricola is a part of the Cyrtophorinae subfamily and shares the sexual dimorphism trait with the Argiopinae, Gasteracanthinae, and Micratheninae subfamilies. Within the argiopoid clade, C. citricola is a member of the argiopine clade because the upper section of its exoskeleton is hairy. This trait distinguishes C. citricola from the Gasteracanthinae and Micratheninae subfamilies. Within the argiopine clade, C. citricola is a member of the Cyrtophorinae family, which includes the genera Cyrtophora and Manogea. Cyrtophorinae's subfamily defining features are its embolus, the palpal bulb's open duct, running in a counterclockwise direction, and its non-adhesive orb-webs.

== Description ==
Cyrtophora citricola occurs in various colors and may have different colored spots on the abdomen. The spider is sexually dimorphic. Females may reach 10 millimetres (0.39 in) long and are larger than their male counterparts who are usually 3 millimetres (0.12 in) long. C. citricola's legs are different lengths with legs I and II being the longest. In Florida, male spiders are black, while females can change the color of their abdomens to match their surroundings and can camouflage in their webs. The females have white trichobothria. In Turkey, they usually appear brown with grey hair.

C. citricola has a distinctive horizontal bifurcation at the posterior abdomen. C. citricola is different from its other relatives because it has two pairs of dorsal tubercles and a pair of posterior tubercles. C. citricola typically has seven denticles. The opisthosoma has two dorsal pairs of protuberances and two posterior lobes. C. citricola has two rows of eyes. The largest eyes are the two median eyes in the anterior row. In some places, C. citricola may be confused with Mecynogea lemniscata.

== Habitat and distribution ==
Cyrtophora citricola is found in Asia, Africa, Australia, Costa Rica, Hispaniola, Colombia, and Southern Europe. The species is unable to survive in temperatures below -1 °C (30.2 °F). C. citricola was also discovered in Florida in 2000 and it makes its webs on canal bridges from the east end of Everglades National Park to the east coast. The spider lives in a wide range of environments, but it is most prevalent in olive orchards and undergrowth. C. citricola is also found in tropical agricultural operations.

C. citricola can be found globally, unlike its close relatives that are concentrated in specific parts of the world. C. citricola's global presence may be a problem as seen in the Americas. The spider is becoming common in agricultural and urban spaces. It is damaging farm operations. Currently, there are active efforts to remove the spider as its web is known to damage flora.

C. citricola exhibits thermoregulative behaviors. This trait is common in web-building spiders, including Nephila clavipes, N. maculata, and Frontinella communis. During the hottest portions of the day, the spider will position themselves so that as little surface area of their body is shown to the sun as possible.

== Behavior ==
=== Web ===
Cyrtophora citricola builds tent-webs that have a horizontal orb web and a network of webs above it resembling a tent. These webs can be built alone or as part of a colony. The spiders exhibit advantages living in colonies, but there is no selection towards either solitary or colonial living. Within colonies, the horizontal orb webs are solitary and maintained by individuals. Other Araneidae species have a triad complex on their posterior spinnerets which produce a gluey thread material for the webs from the piriform glands. C. citricola lacks a triad complex and is unable to make gluey thread web material so it creates a distinct non-sticky, mesh-like web.

C. citricola creates a thick silk strand barrier above the orb and a thinner barrier below the orb. The silk above the web is used to deflect insects onto the orb web below. The webs above and below the horizontal orb webs are communal and maintained by the colony. The horizontal orb web and silk are not sticky. The orb webs appear as a fine mesh curtaining, made of radii and a non-adhesive structural spiral. This structure is different than the typical Araneidae family webs, as they lack a viscid spiral. These webs are durable, and may have evolved to be created outside of citrus trees. The webs may be large enough to span entire trees and are found on a variety of tree species.

C. citricola prefers to build its webs on firm substrates rather than non-firm substrates. Webs built on firmer substrates tend to last for longer periods of time. The webs are strong enough to withstand environmental pressures, such as rain and wind. Unlike adhesive webs, which must be respun daily, non-adhesive webs are only repaired when damaged. Most of this damage occurs at the peripheries of colony webs where the costs to create orb-webs is high. The center of these colonies infrequently require repairs, saving the spider the constant investment of respinning the web.

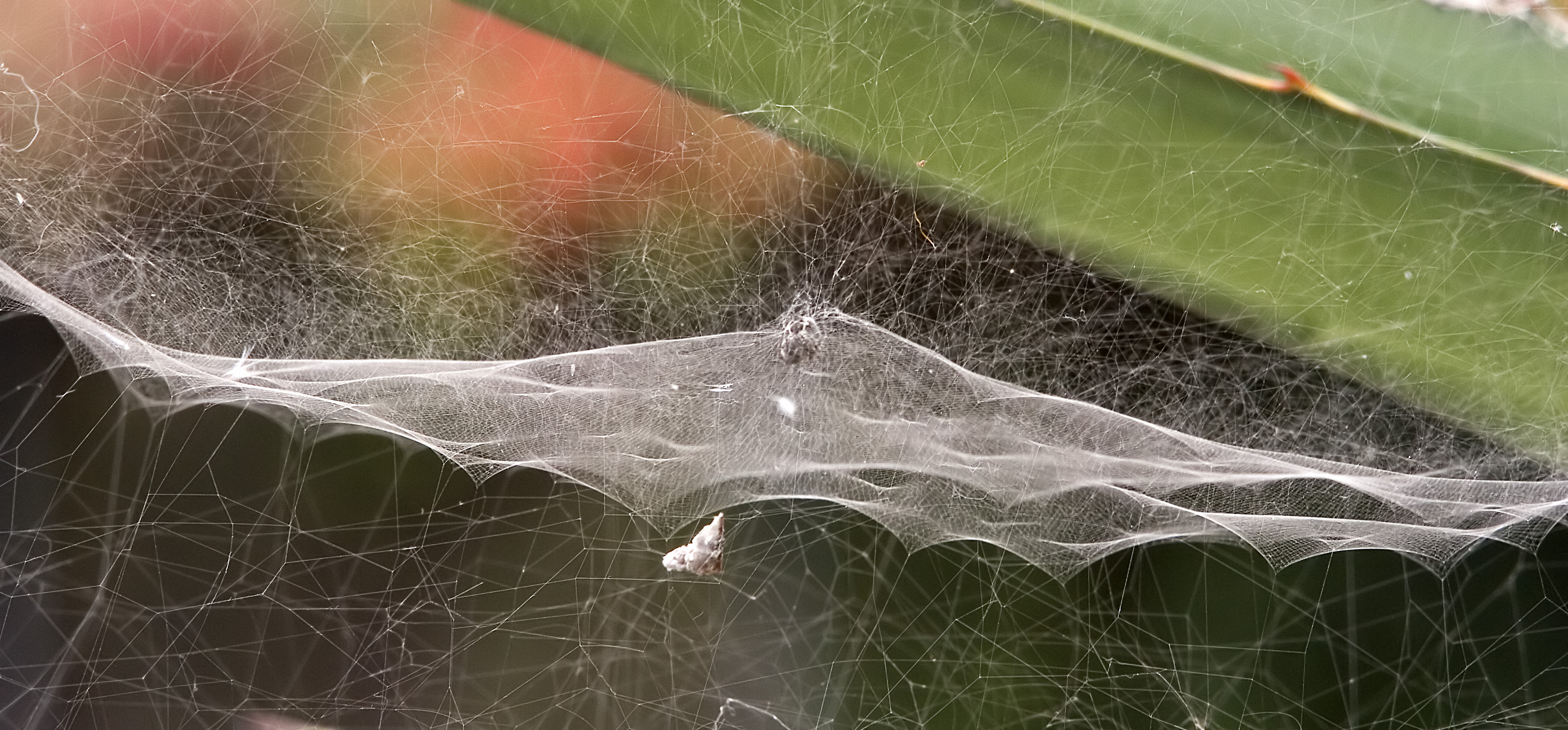
C. citricola web

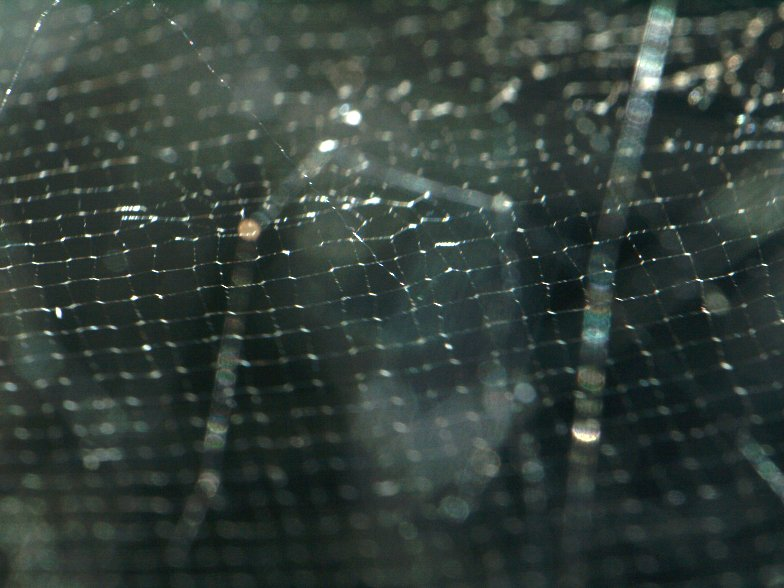
C. citricola web detail

C. citricola typically rests with all of its legs underneath its body when it is not watching over its egg sacs and uses various motions to detect prey and intrusions. The spider sits on the hub of the web. This positioning occurs during the night and day. C. citricola also participates in web jerking, an act of quickly pulling the radii with a front leg. Web jerking may occur in response to movement in the web and prey capturing. The behavior may allow the spider to accurately find objects in its web, assist in prey location, and transmit signals. In addition, the spider engages in web shaking, motions that cause sudden and rapid shaking of its webs. This shaking is created by a downward motion from the spiders' legs. C. citricola engages in web shaking to dislodge prey stuck in the upper barrier of the web. It may also shake off approaching kleptoparasites.

=== Prey ===
C. citricola captures its prey in the upper section of the web. The rate of prey per capita due to web deflection is relatively low and may cause spiders to aggregate together. Spiders who live in social aggregates are more efficient at capturing prey than solitary spiders.

The process of capturing prey includes multiple steps. The first step is either biting the prey or wrapping it in silk. The second step is pulling and cutting the prey out of the web. The third step involves transporting the prey to the hub of the web by either carrying it in its jaws or rewrapping it and carrying it in silk. In the fourth step, the spider feeds on the prey in the hub of the web.

C. citricola has four attack sequences. In the first variation, the spider wraps its prey and bites it. After biting the prey, the spider removes the prey from the web, rewraps it, and transports it to the hub. The second sequence follows the steps of the first variation but skips the biting stage. The third variation starts with the spider biting its prey and wrapping its prey. Later, the prey is removed and rewrapped before being transported to the web hub. The fourth sequence involves spiders biting and pulling or cutting the prey. The prey is transported to the hub in the spider's jaws. Whether the prey is bitten, wrapped, or both is determined by the type of prey that is captured.

C. citricola preys on moths and flies. These insects are bitten and carried to the hub on silk. Orthopteras are also captured and eaten by C. citricola using a variety of the above sequences. Other common prey include dragonflies, beetles, and pentatomids.

=== Reproduction ===
C. citricola is active from the middle of summer to the beginning of fall and adults mate between June and September. Adult male spiders look for females. These spiders exhibit sexual cannibalism at high rates. Female spiders will often eat males after mating. Females cannibalize males after most successful copulations, up to 100% of the time. Spider age and feeding state have no effect on whether the male will be cannibalized. This sexual cannibalism encourages males to be choosy when picking a female mate. Males prefer to mate younger, well-fed, and virgin females. Females are not as choosy in their male mates, but may prefer well-fed and older males. About 50% of females re-mate within ten days after their first copulation. Sexual cannibalism forces monogamy on the male spiders.

The female begins the mating process. Females traditionally approach the male until they are 1 cm from the male. At this point, the male advances quickly towards the female and tries to insert his pedipalp. If successful, copulation begins and lasts for a few seconds. This is the stage at which copulation most often fails.

Unlike other cannibalizing spiders, the male C. citricola does not somersault into the female's chelicerae. The female bends her cephalothorax and orients herself to attack the male's abdomen while the pedipalp is in the female. The male is eaten and the pedipalp is detached from the female.

=== Sociality ===
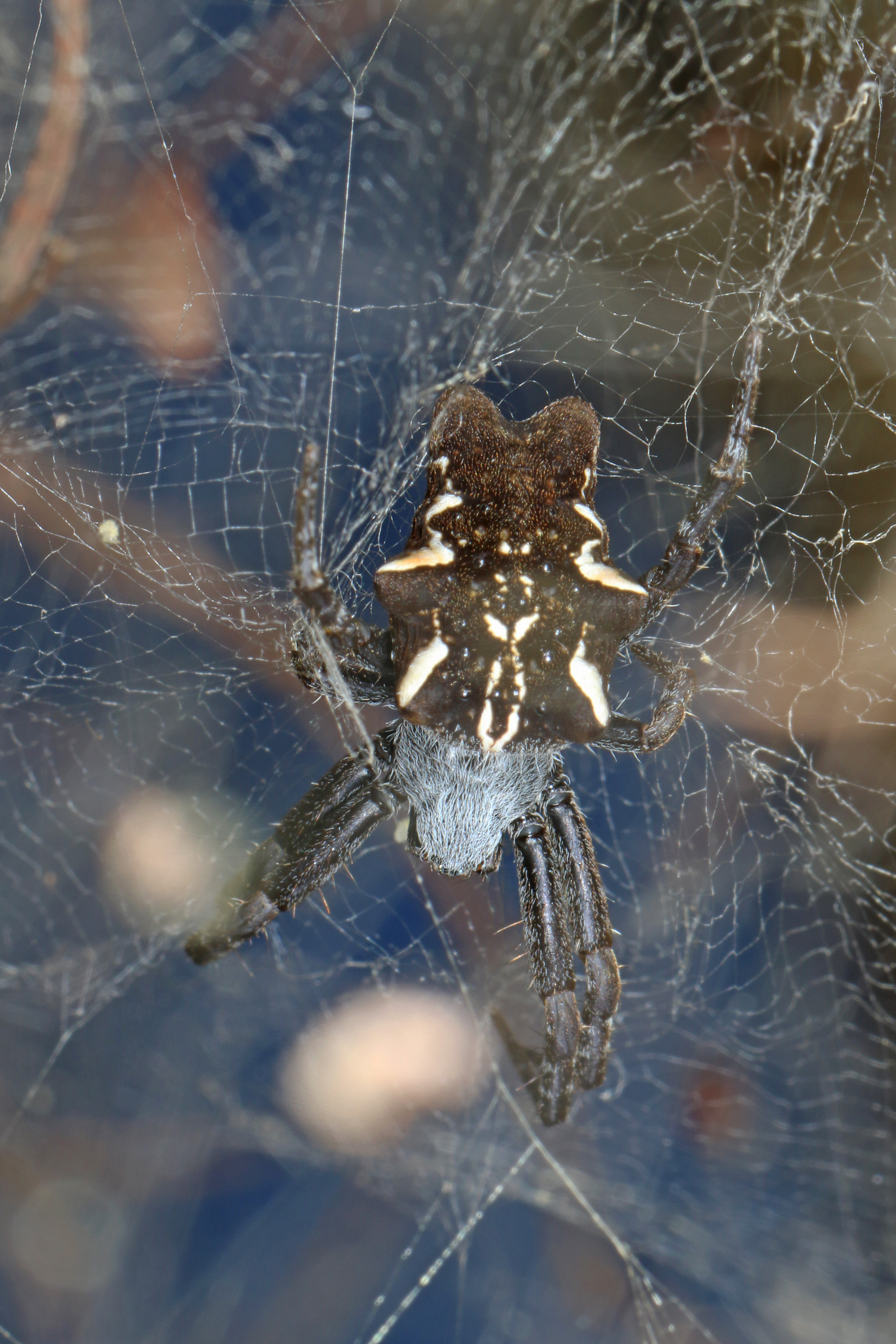
C. citricola in Gorongosa National Park

C. citricola may exhibit aggregate social interactions with one another and live cooperatively in groups. This behavior is distinct amongst spiders, as most spiders are solitary. C. citricola make their own individual webs, but these webs are interconnected. This large network of webs with neighboring spiders creates a massive web matrix. Given the large size and visibility of the colonial web, prey who are visually acute may avoid approaching the colony. If one member of a colonial group senses a nearby predator or prey, they perform a knee jerk on the web. This jerk often begins a chain reaction; up to 75% of nearby spiders may follow suit and jerk their webs as well.

Within colonies, there are three zones where spiders may live: the outside, the intermediate, and the inside zones. Spiders living in the intermediate zone have the best rates of prey capture. Larger colonies have higher prey capture rates compared to smaller colonies and capture rates are higher for spiders at night compared to day.

C. citricola generally coexist peacefully. They may exhibit aggressive behaviors if another spider tries to take their prey. Colony living may have evolved because of the foraging benefits of group living for the spiders, although solitary living may be favored when prey is scarce. Conditional sociality is another evolutionary explanation for why group living evolved in this species. Possibilities for this development may be protection against parasites or predators and how colonial webs allow juveniles to easily create their first webs.

Some C. citricola live individually with no colony, alone without other organisms. Solitary spiders have larger webs, produce more eggs, and have more kleptoparasites than colonies. There is no difference in female size and prey capture rates when comparing colonial and solitary spiders. There are two hypotheses for the limited physical differences between solitary and colonial spiders. The first hypothesis is that spiders can move back and forth between colonial and solitary living throughout their lives. The second hypothesis is that prey capture is similar in both colonial and solitary spiders, allowing for similar physical development. Both hypotheses may explain the many similarities between solitary and colonial spiders.

=== Territoriality ===
C. citricola exhibits territorial behavior over its orb-webs, but tent webs are communal and no aggressive behavior was documented between spiders that travel across these webs. At night there are conflicts between orb-less spiders and orb-possessing spiders. These fights occur due to competition for better feeding locations. Larger spiders typically win in fights over smaller spiders.

Invading spiders may come from the colony's periphery, where costs to build webs are often high due to continuous repair and diminished prey capture. Peripheral webs often experience damage from weather and predators whereas central webs remain undisturbed. Conflict arises when an orb-less intruder approaches and vibrates the web. This action is a sign of attack and solicits the same response from the defending spider. The vibrations between the attacker and the defender continue for a few minutes; however, the invader rarely captures the web and instead it retreats.

=== Parental care ===
The egg sacs of C. citricola have a diameter ranging from 12–20 millimetres (0.47–0.79 in). These egg sacs are laid in chains of up to 10 sacs in a row on the webs. The eggs are colored bluish-green. Each egg sac contains between 100 and 200 eggs and the eggs are shaped as flat ellipticals. The number of eggs produced depends on various environmental factors, including food availability. Solitary females can produce up to 20% more eggs than females living in colonies. The reduction of eggs in colonies may be due to better parasite protection and reduced predation. Females with egg sacs will typically rest directly underneath the egg sac in order to guard them.

Juveniles usually disperse or build their own webs off the maternal webs after four days. Juveniles in larger webs are less likely to leave their mother's web. Mothers feed offspring, but when prey is scarce there is increased sibling aggression. These resource-poor conditions increase the likelihood of early dispersal from the maternal web.

C. citricola prefers to select nest sites and create webs in the forks between branches and leaves.

== Predators and parasitoids ==
Argyrodes argyrodes, another species of spider, may steal Cyrtophora citricola's prey and eggs. In addition, Holocnemus pluchei, also known as daddy long-legs, has been found to build their webs off of C. citricola's webs. H. pluchei exhibit aggressive behavior towards C. citricola and are observed eating C. citricola juveniles. C. citricola will drop to the ground if attacked, in an attempt to camouflage. C. citricola may also pull all of its legs inwards towards its abdomen.

A. gibbosus often acts as a kleptoparasite to C. citricola, stealing prey that the C. citricola caught. A. gibbosus is known to switch strategies depending on where the host is located. Prey is stolen when the host is in the hub of the web. A. gibbosus has been observed waiting for C. citricola to go foraging before consuming their eggs.

Pediobius pyrgo is a type of wasp that lays its eggs in C. citricola egg sacs. The wasp is present in the Iberian Peninsula and in the Canary Islands. Philolema palanichamyi is another type of wasp that lays its eggs in C. citricola egg sacs. The wasp affects these spiders primarily in the Canary Islands and can parasitize around 40% of egg sacs. Wasp larvae feed on the spider's eggs and each larva will devour significant portions of the egg sacs; incubation lasts approximately seven weeks. Wasp larvae often cause a large portion of parasitized spider egg-sacs to die. Parasitization decreases emerging spiderling populations by approximately 60%.

=== Protective coloration and behavior ===
Cyrtophora citricola can change its abdomen's color to blend in with the environment. The coloring of the female Floridian spiders allows them to appear as brown, dead leaves when sitting in their webs, preventing potential predators from spotting them.

== Agricultural impact ==
Ornamental trees, fruit trees, and various flowering plants in the genus Eugenia including E. coronata, have high concentrations of Cyrtophora citricola. These plants and trees may experience incomplete death when C. citricola's webs span over their leaves. This may be due to the thickness of the webs that can restrict airflow to the leaves. As a result, some authorities have opted to use high-pressure water sprayers and chemical controls to exterminate colonies.

C. citricola is problematic for many agricultural operations in South America, including coffee and citrus plantations. It is listed as an important agricultural pest in the Dominican Republic due to its devastating impact on citrus trees. Additionally, it is increasingly common in the Southern states of North America. In Florida, the spider has become a common backyard nuisance.
