= C. hirta =

C. hirta may refer to:

- Caladenia hirta, an orchid species in the genus Caladenia
- Calamidia hirta, a moth species found in Australia, from Queensland to Tasmania
- Calamagrostis hirta, a grass species found only in Ecuador
- Carex hirta, a sedge species in the genus Carex
- Cladophlebis hirta, an extinct fern species which grew during the Mesozoic and late Paleozoic eras
- Clidemia hirta, the soapbush or Koster's curse, a perennial shrub species invasive in many tropical regions of the world
- Crocidura hirta, the lesser red musk shrew, a mammal species found in Africa
- Cyrtophora hirta, a spider species in the genus Cyrtophora found in Queensland

== See also ==
- Hirta (disambiguation)
