= Cyrtophora parangexanthematica =

Scientific classification
- Kingdom: Animalia
- Phylum: Arthropoda
- Subphylum: Chelicerata
- Class: Arachnida
- Order: Araneae
- Infraorder: Araneomorphae
- Family: Araneidae
- Genus: Cyrtophora
- Species: C. parangexanthematica

Binomial name
- Cyrtophora parangexanthematica Barrion & Litsinger, 1995
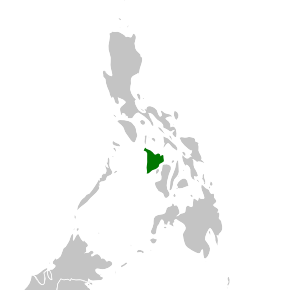
- C. parangexanthematica distribution map.

Species of spider

Cyrtophora parangexanthematica is a species of tent spider found in the Philippines. Its scientific name comes from its close resemblance to double-tailed tent spiders. It was described from a single female specimen collected in 1995.

== Taxonomy ==
C. parangexanethematica was described by A. T. Barrion and J. A. Litsinger in 1995. The description is based on a single female specimen recovered from a rice field. The specific name "parangexanthematica" literally means 'like exanthematica' in Filipino, referring to their close resemblance to double-tailed tent spiders (Cyrtophora exanthematica).

C. parangexanthematica is classified under the genus Cyrtophora (tent-web spiders) and the subfamily Cyrtophorinae. They belong to the orb-weaver spider family Araneidae.

== Description ==
C. parangexanthematica females had a total body length of 8.80 mm (0.346 in).

The cephalothorax was yellowish brown in color, 3.60 mm (0.142 in) long and 2.60 mm (0.102 in) wide. The sternum (ventral surface of the cephalothorax) was yellow brown with small bumps opposite the coxae (the first segment of the appendages attached to the cephalothorax). The eight eyes were arranged in two recurved rows.

The abdomen was yellow in color, 5.20 mm (0.205 in) long and 3.70 mm (0.146 in) wide. On the middle of the upper surface was a distinctive black triangular spot surrounding by eight sigilla (small pitted depressions) arranged in two rows. Like its namesake, C. parangexanthematica had two blunt projections at the posterior end of its abdomen, a pair of 'humps' on the forward part, and a pair of white lines running from the tip of the 'humps' down to below the projections on its rear end. The spinnerets were bordered with white rings and the bottom of the abdomen had pale spots. The epigynum possessed a V-shaped scape (or ovipositor). The sperm receptacles (spermathecae) are globular.

The legs were yellow, not striped, and possessed thin spines. The leg formula is I, II, IV, III (relative lengths of the legs from the longest to the shortest, I is the first pair of legs at the front).

Nothing is known about males of the species.

== Distribution and ecology ==
The single specimen was found in the island of Panay in the Philippines. Nothing else is known about their habitat or behavior in the wild.

== See also ==
- List of Araneidae genera
