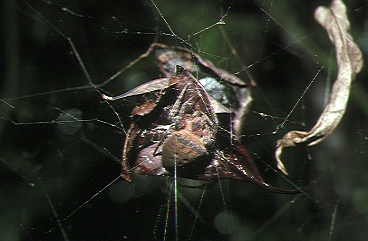

Scientific classification
- Kingdom: Animalia
- Phylum: Arthropoda
- Subphylum: Chelicerata
- Class: Arachnida
- Order: Araneae
- Infraorder: Araneomorphae
- Family: Araneidae
- Genus: Cyrtophora
- Species: C. unicolor

Binomial name
- Cyrtophora unicolor (Doleschall, 1857)

Synonyms
- Epeira unicolor Doleschall, 1857

= Cyrtophora unicolor =

Red tent spider

Species of spider

Cyrtophora unicolor is a species of spider of the family Araneidae. It is known as the red tent spider.

== Description ==
The species shows sexual dimorphism, where the male is small and with faded colors, whereas the female is much larger and with a brilliant red color. The female is 17-20mm in length.

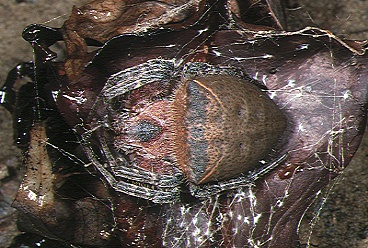
female

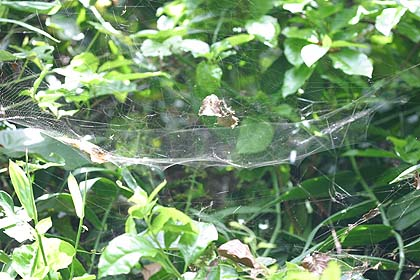
Red tent spider web

The red tent spider builds a large three-dimensional web in vegetation, which is a common feature of members of the genus.

== Distribution ==
It is found in numerous Asian countries, including Singapore, China, Southern Taiwan, Japan, Philippines, Papua New Guinea, Indonesia, Christmas Island, Sri Lanka, Thailand, Myanmar, and north-eastern India.
