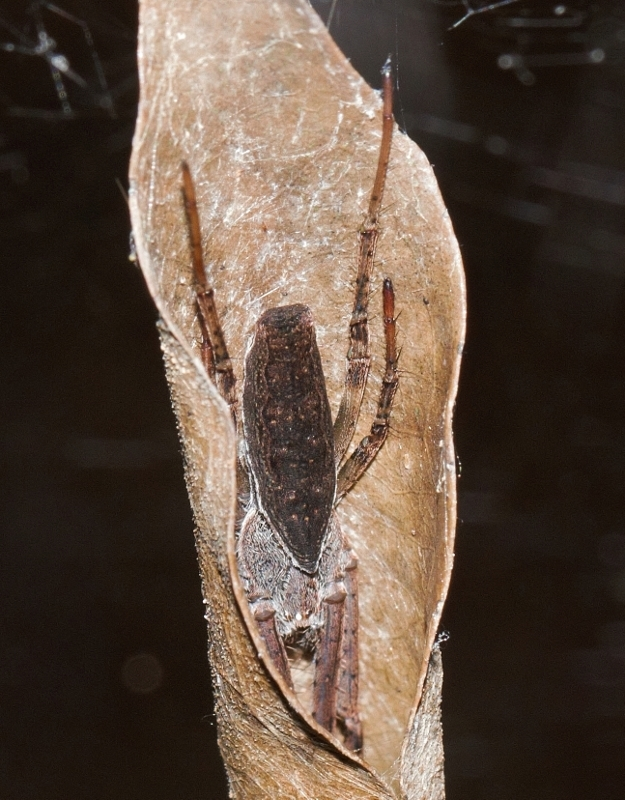

Scientific classification
- Kingdom: Animalia
- Phylum: Arthropoda
- Subphylum: Chelicerata
- Class: Arachnida
- Order: Araneae
- Infraorder: Araneomorphae
- Family: Araneidae
- Genus: Cyrtophora
- Species: C. petersi

Binomial name
- Cyrtophora petersi Karsch, 1878

= Cyrtophora petersi =

Peters' Tropical Tent-Web Spider

Species of spider

Cyrtophora petersi is a species of spider in the family Araneidae. It is endemic to southern Africa and is commonly known as Peters' tropical tent-web spider.

== Distribution ==
Cyrtophora petersi is known from Mozambique and South Africa. In South Africa, it has been recorded from Mpumalanga and KwaZulu-Natal.

== Habitat and ecology ==
The species inhabits the Savanna biome. The species builds modified orb webs known as tent webs. Females were found resting beneath a dead leaf suspended from the hub of the web in sand forest, with males resting in parts of the tent web. One male was sampled in a citrus orchard.

== Description ==
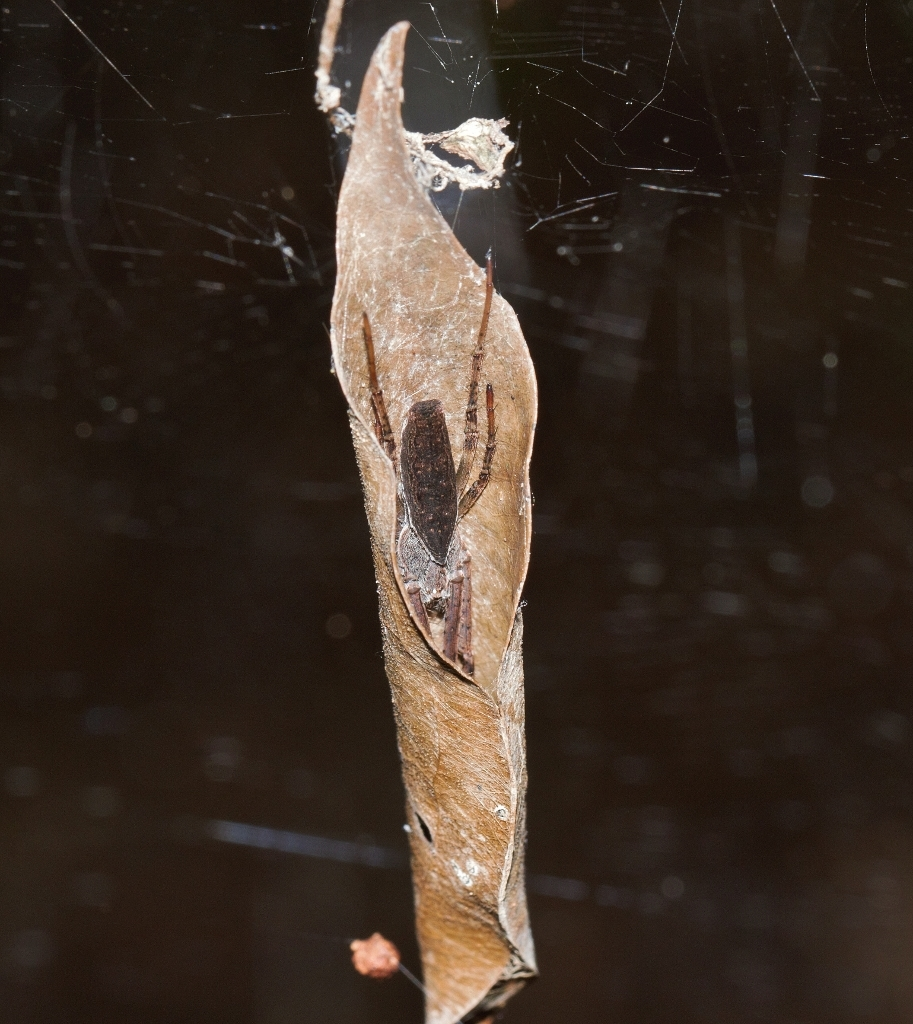

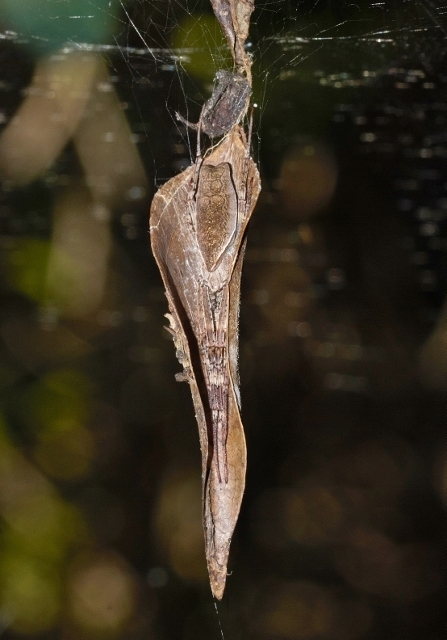

== Conservation ==
Cyrtophora petersi is listed as Least Concern by the South African National Biodiversity Institute due to its wide global geographical range. The species is protected in Tembe Elephant Park.

== Etymology ==
The species is named after Wilhelm Peters, a German naturalist and explorer who made significant contributions to the study of African fauna.

== Taxonomy ==
The species was originally described by Ferdinand Karsch in 1878 from Mozambique. It was recently recorded for the first time from South Africa. The species is known only from the female, with male identification still problematic as it was recently discovered but not yet described.
