= H. hirta =

H. hirta may refer to:

- Hirtopelta hirta, a sea snail species
- Hydrangea hirta, a flowering plant species
- Hyparrhenia hirta, a grass species

== See also ==
- Hirta (disambiguation)
