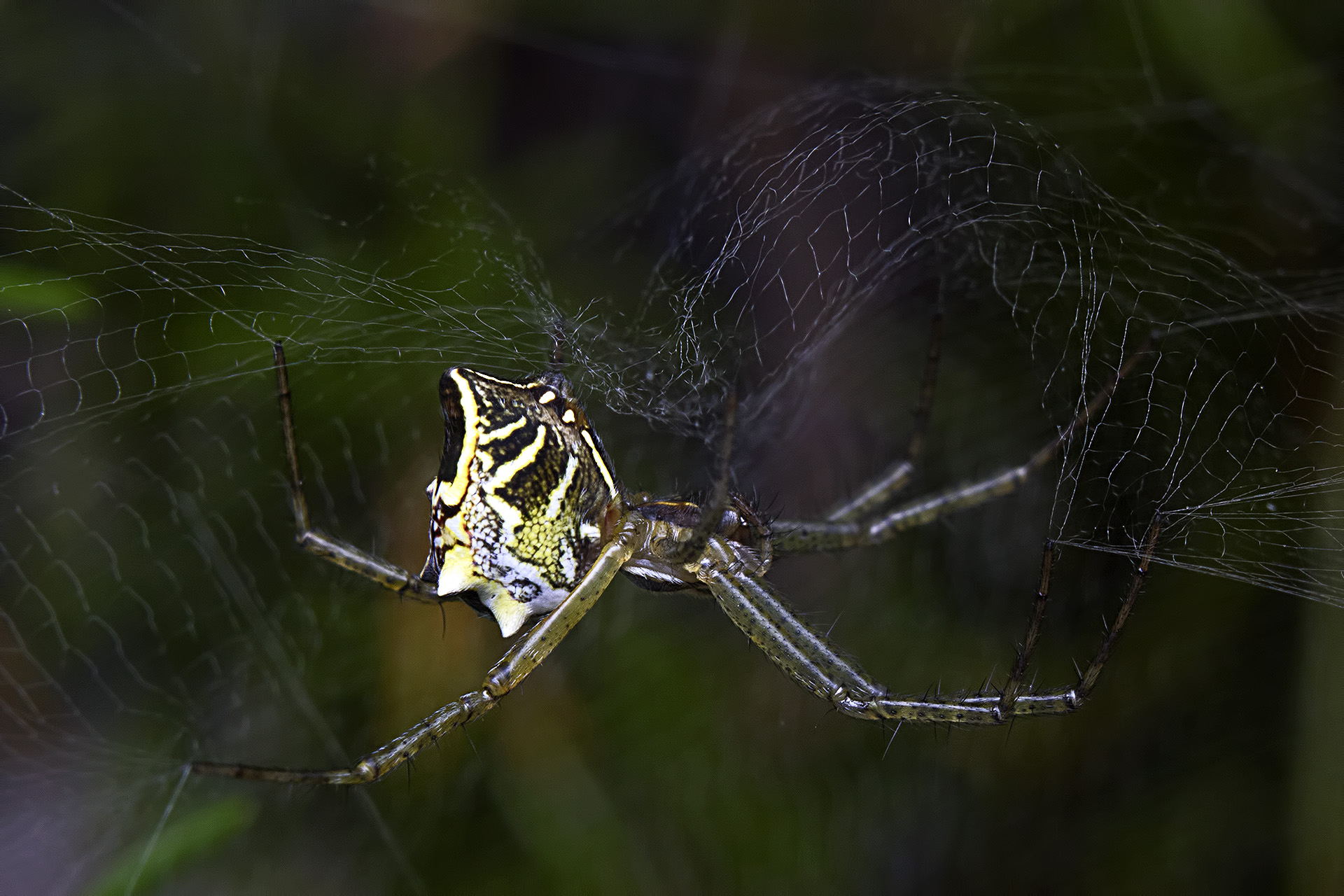
- In bright colouration
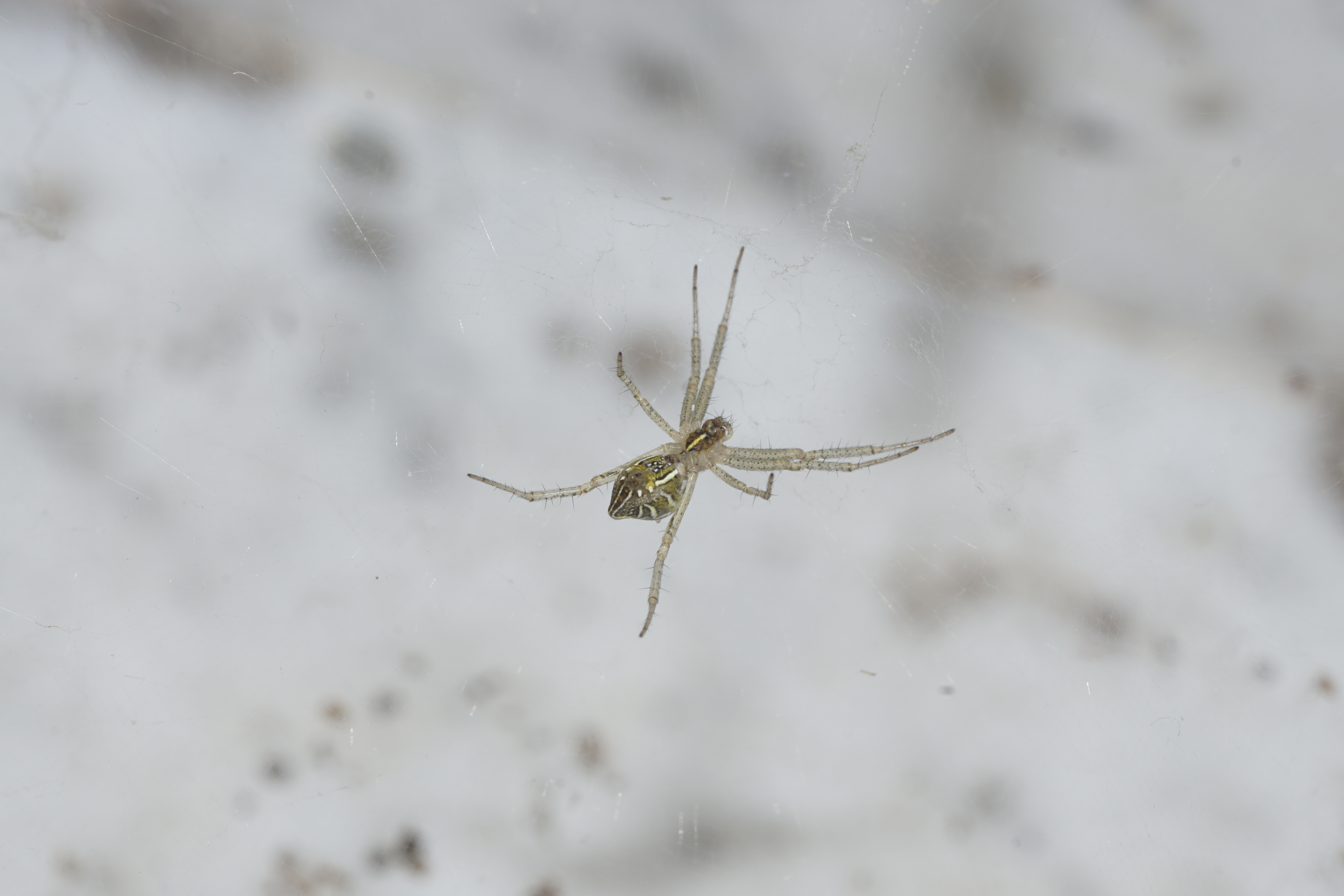
- In typical colouration

Scientific classification
- Domain: Eukaryota
- Kingdom: Animalia
- Phylum: Arthropoda
- Subphylum: Chelicerata
- Class: Arachnida
- Order: Araneae
- Infraorder: Araneomorphae
- Family: Araneidae
- Genus: Cyrtophora
- Species: C. cicatrosa

Binomial name
- Cyrtophora cicatrosa Stoliczka, 1869

= Cyrtophora cicatrosa =

Garden tent-web spider

Species of spider

Cyrtophora cicatrosa, commonly known as the garden tent-web spider or dome spider, is a common species of orb-weavers found in many parts of Asia. It is common in gardens and has a very dense, thick, three dimensional and strong tent-like web.

== Description ==
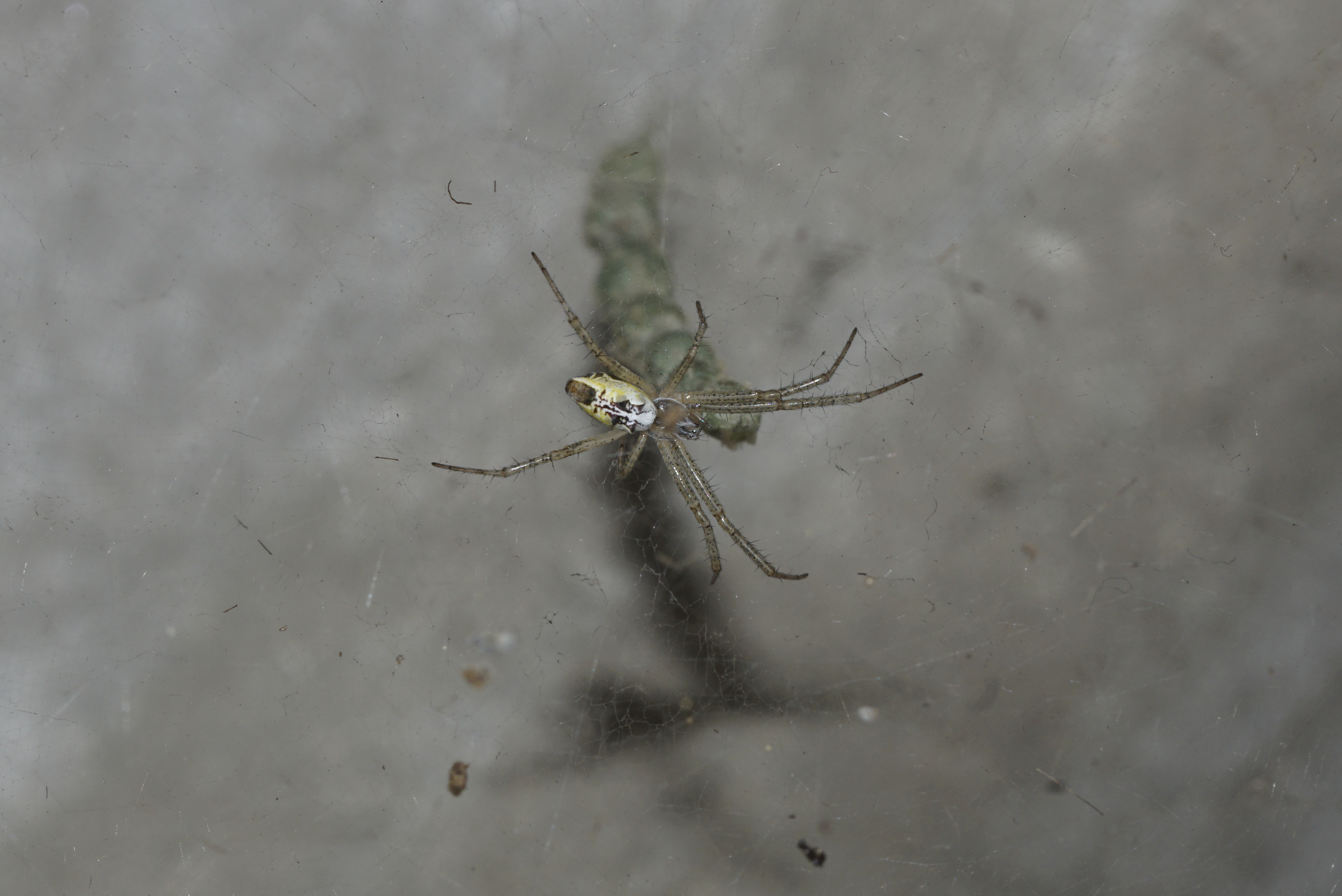
The chain of egg-sacks can be seen in the background.

It is a small spider, which has long legs and a green colour with yellowish markings. It can turn black with white and green markings when flushed. It is often seen upside down. Its web is very strong but lacks sticky fibers. It is built in a three-dimensional and complex dome commonly found between branches of thorny plants, but can be seen basically anywhere. Hence, they do not move very much from the centre of the dome in which they hang upside-down. The dome is connected by many lines to a support, and forms a mountain shape in the middle. A chain of green bean-like egg sacs is also a common sight in these webs.
