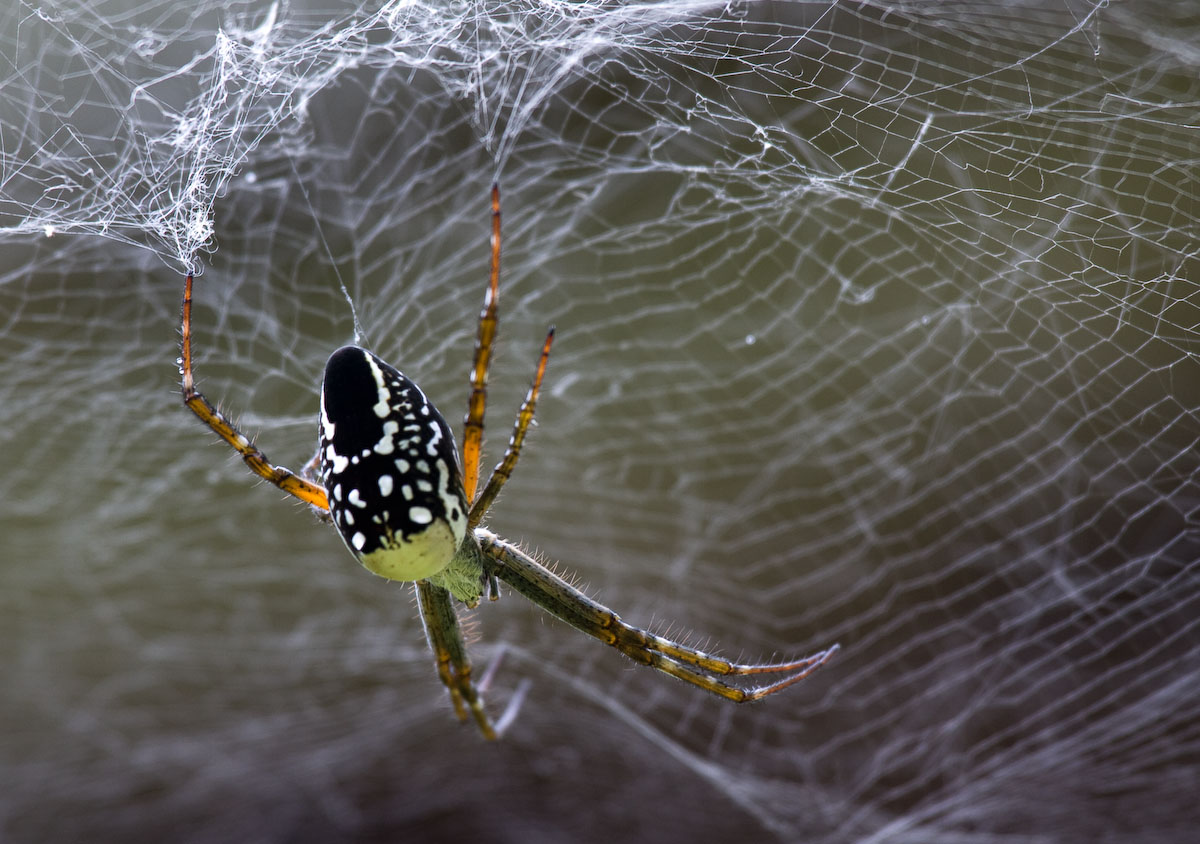
- Cyrtophora moluccensis

Scientific classification
- Kingdom: Animalia
- Phylum: Arthropoda
- Subphylum: Chelicerata
- Class: Arachnida
- Order: Araneae
- Infraorder: Araneomorphae
- Family: Araneidae
- Subfamily: Cyrtophorinae; Simon, 1895

Genera
- See text

= Cyrtophorinae =

Subfamily of spiders

Cyrtophorinae is a subfamily of spiders in the orb-weaver spider family. Unlike other orb-weavers, spiders belonging to Cyrtophorinae build horizontal, finely meshed platforms within a tangle of irregular webs. The usually dome-shaped platform is a non-sticky orb web.

Cyrtophorinae includes the following six genera:

- Cyrtobill Framenau & Scharff, 2009
- Cyrtophora Simon, 1864 (Tent-web spiders)
- Kapogea Levi, 1997
- Mecynogea Simon, 1903
- Megaraneus Lawrence, 1968
- Manogea Levi, 1997
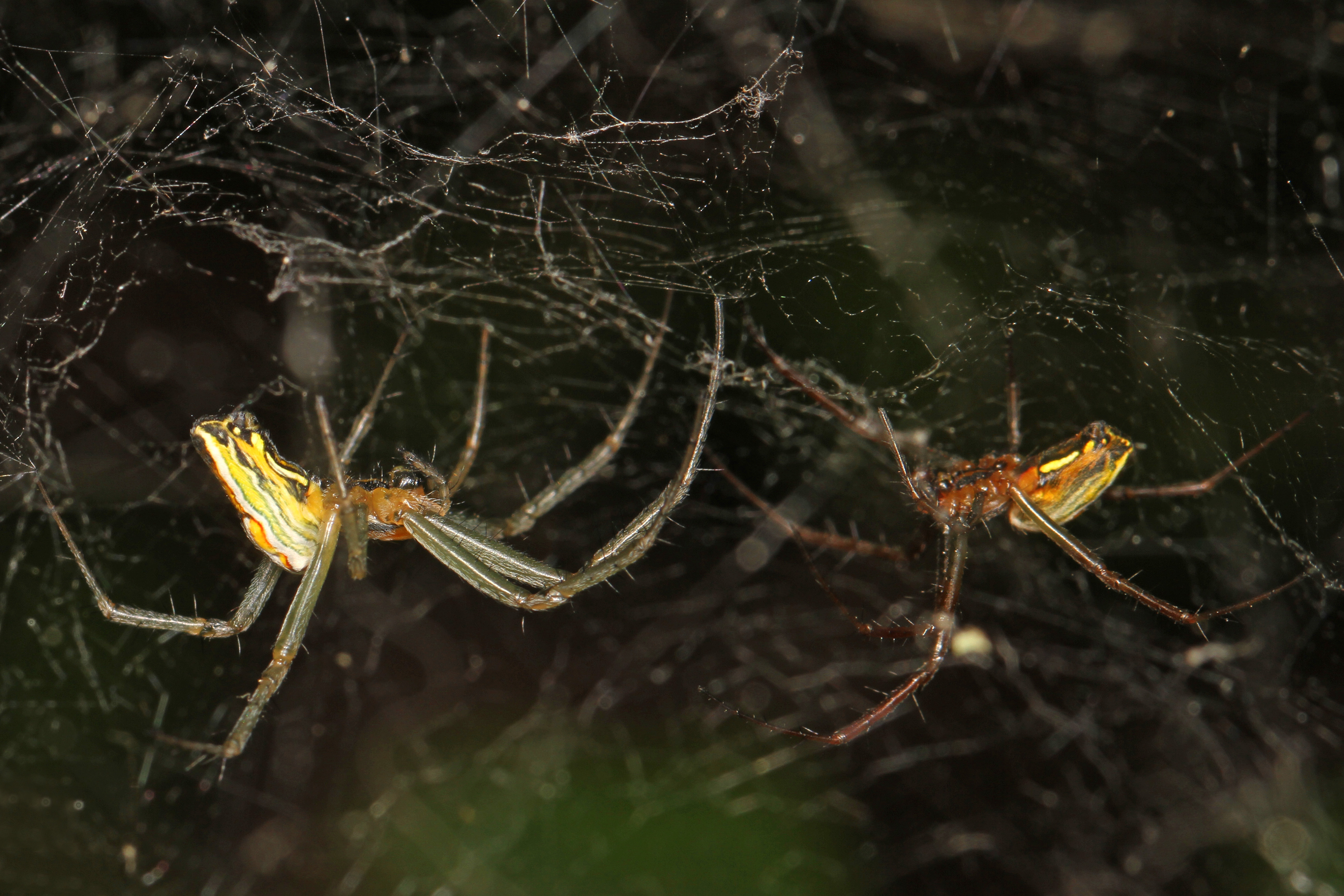
Mecynogea lemniscata: courtship

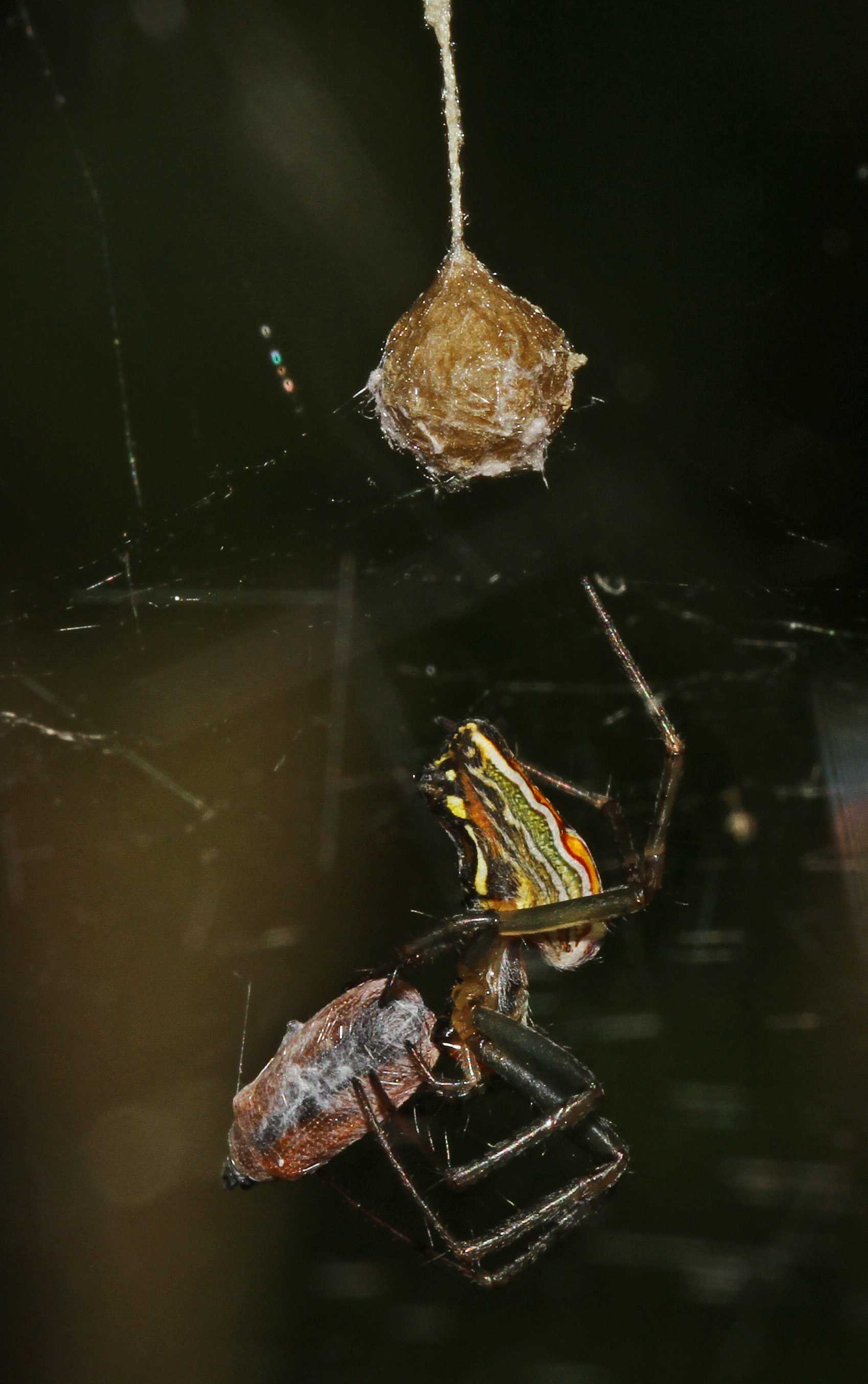
egg sac + prey

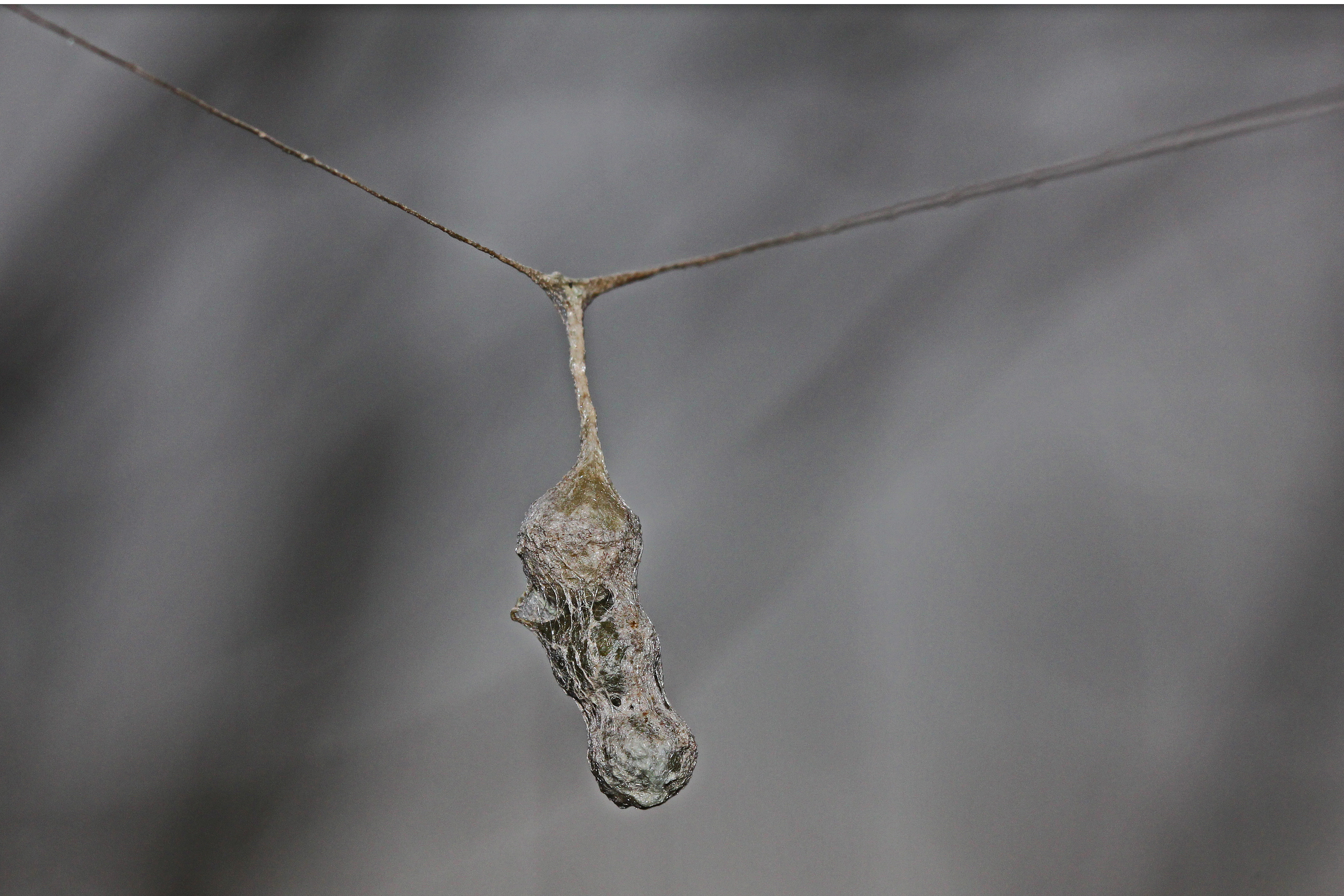
egg sac

== See also ==
- List of Araneidae genera
