= R. hirta =

R. hirta may refer to:

- Rondeletia hirta, a plant species endemic to Jamaica
- Rudbeckia hirta, the black-eyed Susan, blackiehead, brown Betty, brown Daisy, brown-eyed Susan, a flowering plant species

== Synonyms ==
- Rhus hirta, synonym for Rhus typhina, the staghorn sumac, a deciduous shrub to small tree species native to eastern North America

== See also ==
- Hirta (disambiguation)
