= Hirta (disambiguation) =

Hirta is an island in Scotland.

Hirta may also refer to:

== Ships ==
- MPV Hirta Name of a shop of the Scottish Fisheries Protection Agency (SFPA) and the Marine Scotland Compliance (IMO 9386794)

== Places and jurisdictions ==
- Hirta, Mesopotamia, a ruined Ancient city and former Assyrian bishopric, now near Najaf in Iraq and a Latin Catholic titular see

== Biology - binomial species ==
- C. hirta, including species of moth, shrew and fern
- H. hirta, including species of sea snail, flowering plant and grass
- R. hirta, including various plant species

== Other uses ==
- High Intensity Radio Transmission Area, marked on CAA flight maps that may interfere with readings or flight controls.
