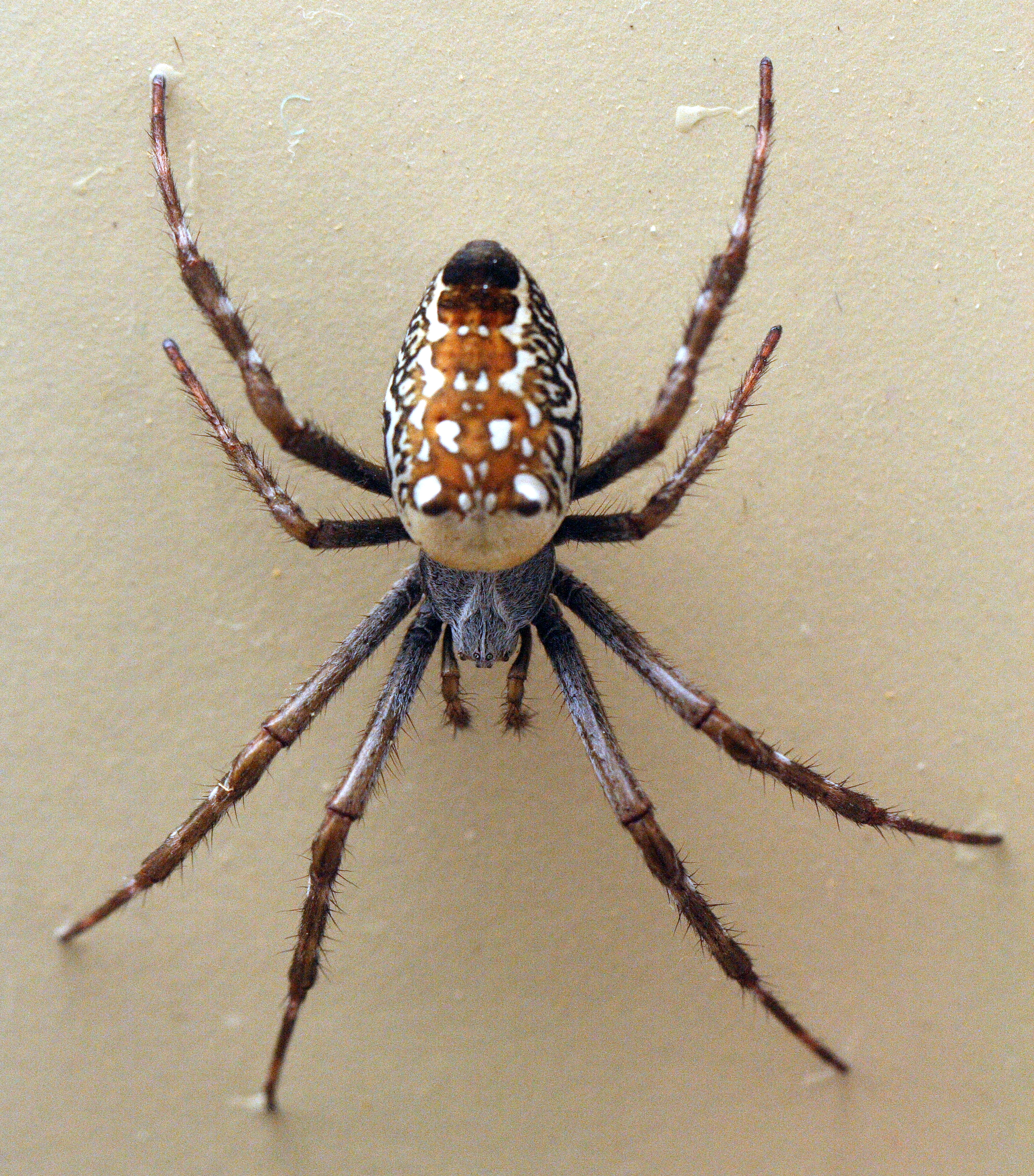
- Specimen in the Australian Museum

Scientific classification
- Domain: Eukaryota
- Kingdom: Animalia
- Phylum: Arthropoda
- Subphylum: Chelicerata
- Class: Arachnida
- Order: Araneae
- Infraorder: Araneomorphae
- Family: Araneidae
- Genus: Cyrtophora
- Species: C. moluccensis

Binomial name
- Cyrtophora moluccensis (Doleschall, 1857)

Synonyms
- Araneus moluccensis; Argiope leuco-picta; Argiope marxii; Argiope thai; Epeira hieroglyphica; Epeira moluccensis; Euetria moluccensis; Cyrtophora albopunctata; Cyrtophora leucopicta; Cyrtophora simoni; Suzumia moluccensis

= Cyrtophora moluccensis =

Species of spider

Cyrtophora moluccensis is a tent-web spider in the orb-weaver family. It is commonly known as the tent spider or dome-web spider, and is native to India, Japan, Indonesia, Papua New Guinea, Australia, Fiji, and Tonga. It is often found in disturbed or open habitats from coasts to forest and mountainous interiors.

The abdomen is high and the anterior end overhangs the cephalothorax. It can be distinguished from similar species by the two tubercles on its abdomen, its elaborate pattern, and, in females, the shape of the median septum of the epigyne. In males, the embolus of the pedipalp is enclosed within the conductor. Females and immature spiders are yellow to green in color.

Webs built by Cyrtophora species are different from typical webs built by orb-weavers. The orb web is built horizontally with a finely meshed dome or bowl shape, hence the name "dome-web spider". The non-sticky spiral is left intact and webs are without a sticky spiral. A 1980 study suggests that this type of web derives from the typical orb web and not the other way around. These webs are durable, sometimes lasting several weeks, so they don't need to be remade every day like the webs of most spiders.

Webs can be either solitary or colonial, though even in groups, each web is defended by its owner. Colonial groups can cover an area of fifteen meters squared and include over four hundred individuals, including fifty adults. Young spiders will often build their nests within the space of that of their parent's. Webs of this spider have also been known to be host to Argyrodes miniaceus or young spiders of other species.

== Subspecies ==
- Cyrtophora moluccensis albidinota (Strand, 1911) – Caroline Islands, Palau, Yap
- Cyrtophora moluccensis bukae (Strand, 1911) – Solomon Islands
- Cyrtophora moluccensis cupidinea (Thorell, 1875) – New Caledonia
- Cyrtophora moluccensis margaritacea (Doleschall, 1859) – Java
- Cyrtophora moluccensis rubicundinota (Strand, 1911) – Keule Islands, near New Guinea

== Gallery ==
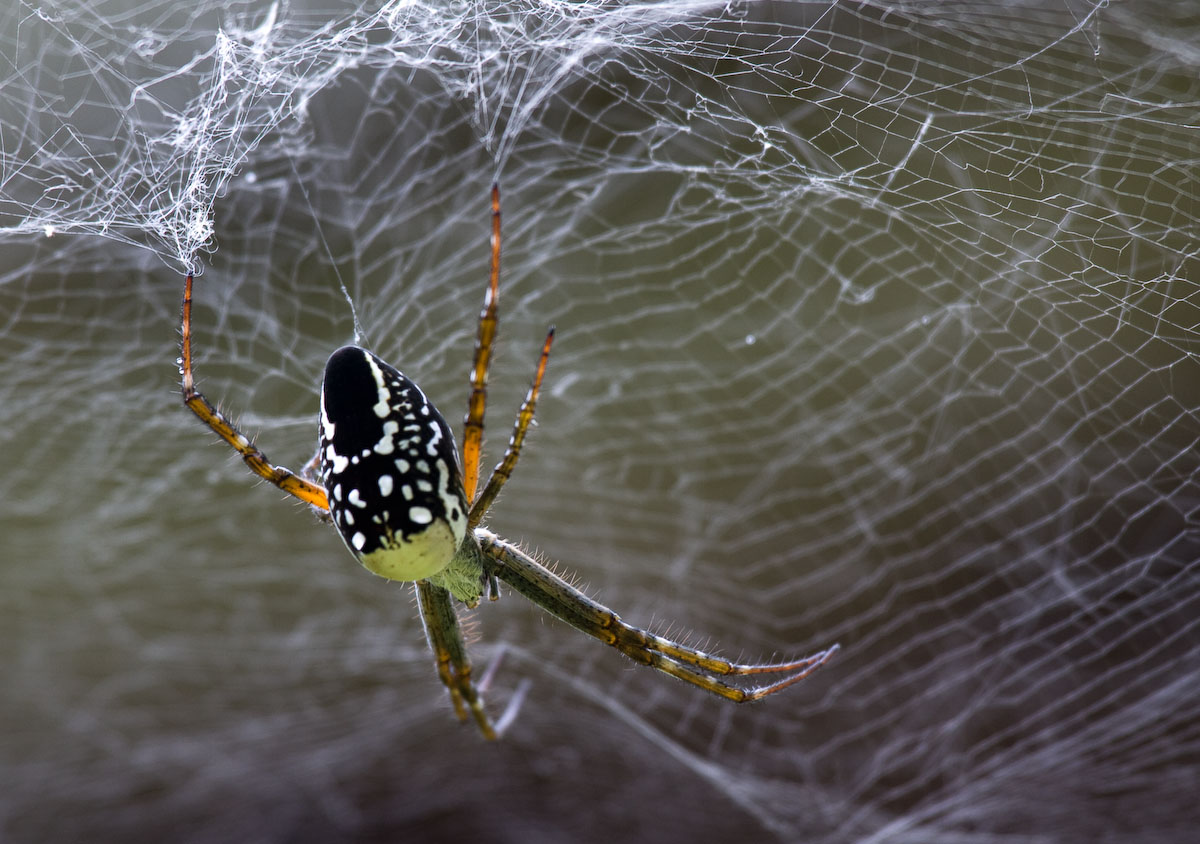
Cyrtophora moluccensis in Cairns

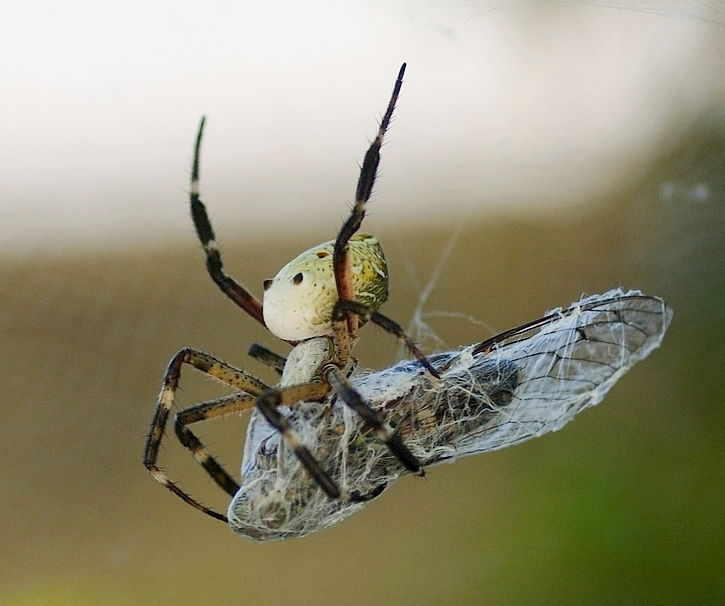
With prey in Kobe, Japan

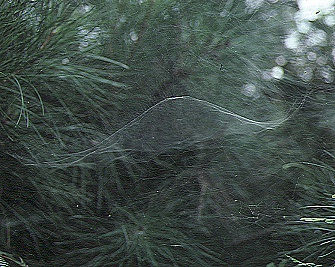
Shape of the web in Okinawa

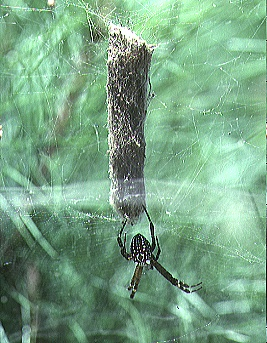
Female with eggsac in Okinawa
