= Kapogea =

Scientific classification
- Kingdom: Animalia
- Phylum: Arthropoda
- Subphylum: Chelicerata
- Class: Arachnida
- Order: Araneae
- Infraorder: Araneomorphae
- Family: Araneidae
- Genus: Kapogea; Levi, 1997

Type species
- K. sellata (Simon, 1895)

Species
- 4, see text

Genus of spiders

Kapogea is a genus of orb-weaver spiders first described by Herbert Walter Levi in 1997.

== Species ==
As of November 2026 it contains four species in the Americas, from Mexico to Brazil:

- Kapogea cyrtophoroides (F. O. Pickard-Cambridge, 1904) – Mexico to Peru, Bolivia, Brazil
- Kapogea isosceles (Mello-Leitão, 1939) – Greater Antilles, Panama to Argentina
- Kapogea sellata (Simon, 1895) – Greater Antilles, Costa Rica to Argentina
- Kapogea sexnotata (Simon, 1895) – Venezuela to Peru, Bolivia, Brazil
