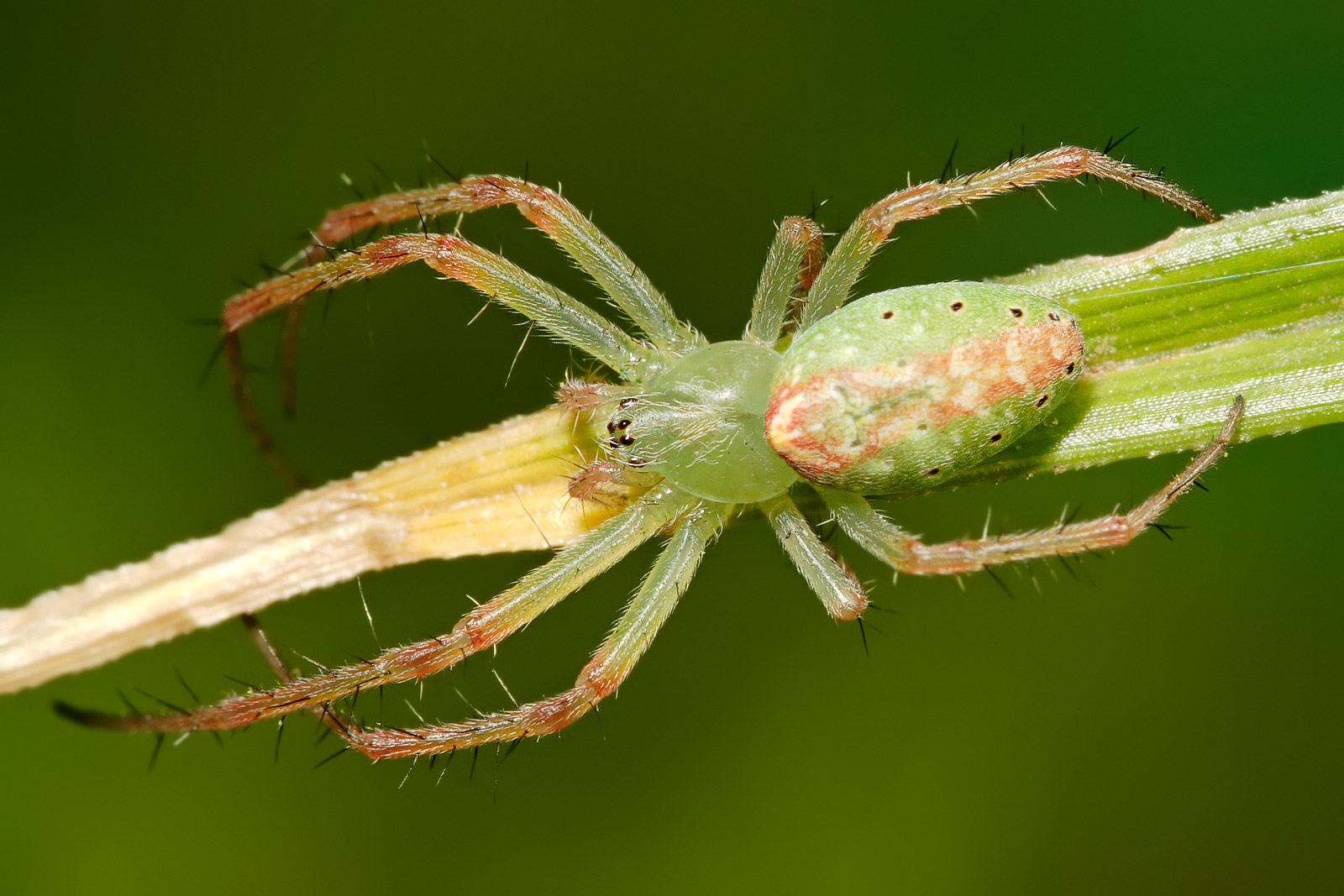
- Green tent-web spider
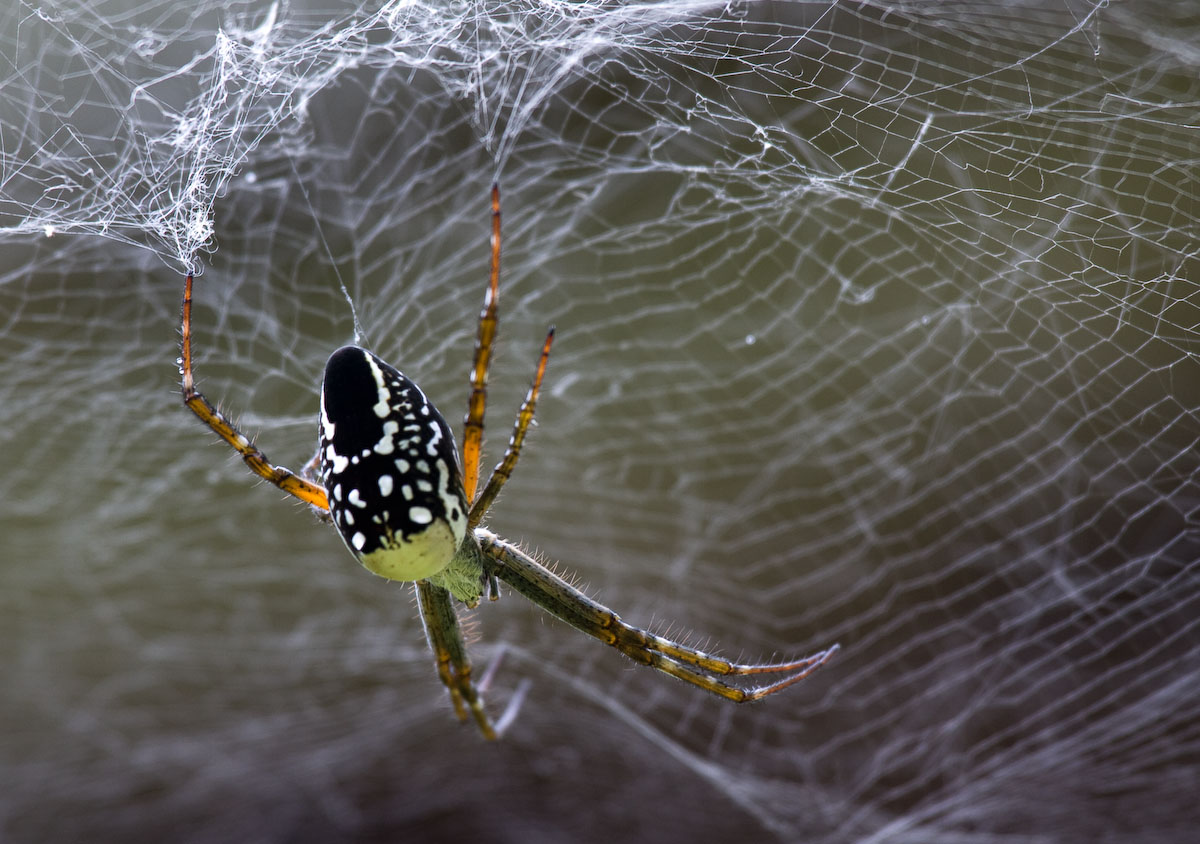
- Cyrtophora moluccensis suspended beneath its web

Scientific classification
- Kingdom: Animalia
- Phylum: Arthropoda
- Subphylum: Chelicerata
- Class: Arachnida
- Order: Araneae
- Infraorder: Araneomorphae
- Family: Araneidae
- Subfamily: Cyrtophorinae
- Genus: Cyrtophora; Simon, 1864

Type species
- C. citricola (Forsskål, 1775)

Species
- 46, see text

Synonyms
- Suzumia

= Cyrtophora =

Tent-web spider

Genus of spiders

Cyrtophora, the tent-web spiders, is a genus of orb-weaver spiders first described by Eugène Simon in 1895. Although they are in the "orb weaver" family, they do not build orb webs. Their tent-like, highly complex non-sticky web is sometimes considered a precursor of the simplified orb web. These webs are aligned horizontally, with a network of supporting threads above them. These spiders often live in colonies. Females have a body length of mostly about 10 millimetres (0.39 in) long. Some members, including Cyrtophora cicatrosa, exhibit the ability to change colour rapidly.

A kleptoparasitic spider (Argyrodes fissifrons) was found to live in a mutualistic relationships with Cyrtophora species. Some of the species are considered social spiders, building large structures where the territories of the offspring are built along the margin of the mothers web.

== Species ==
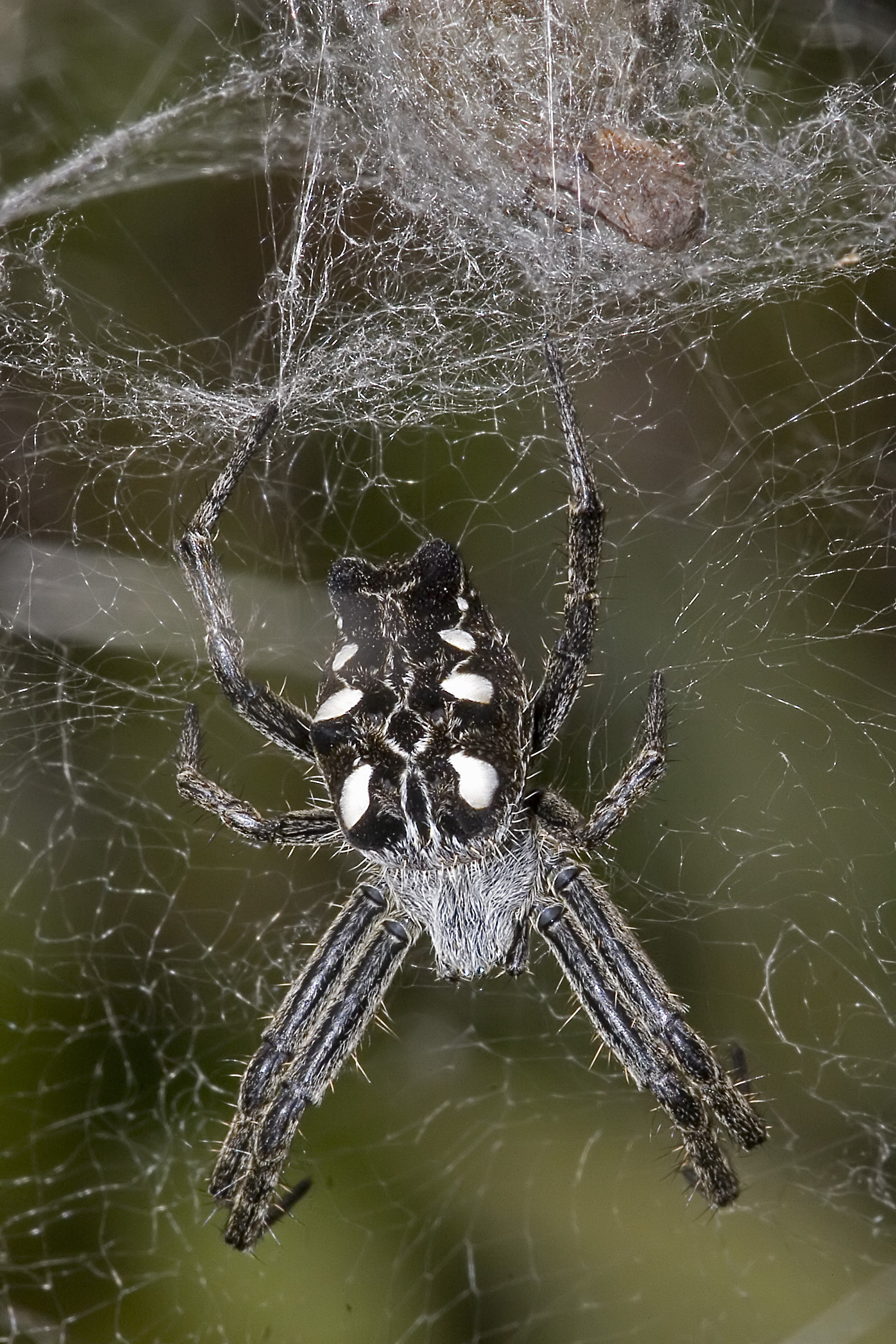
C. citricola

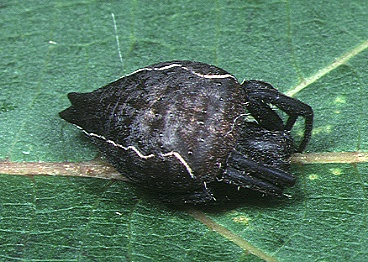
C. exanthematica

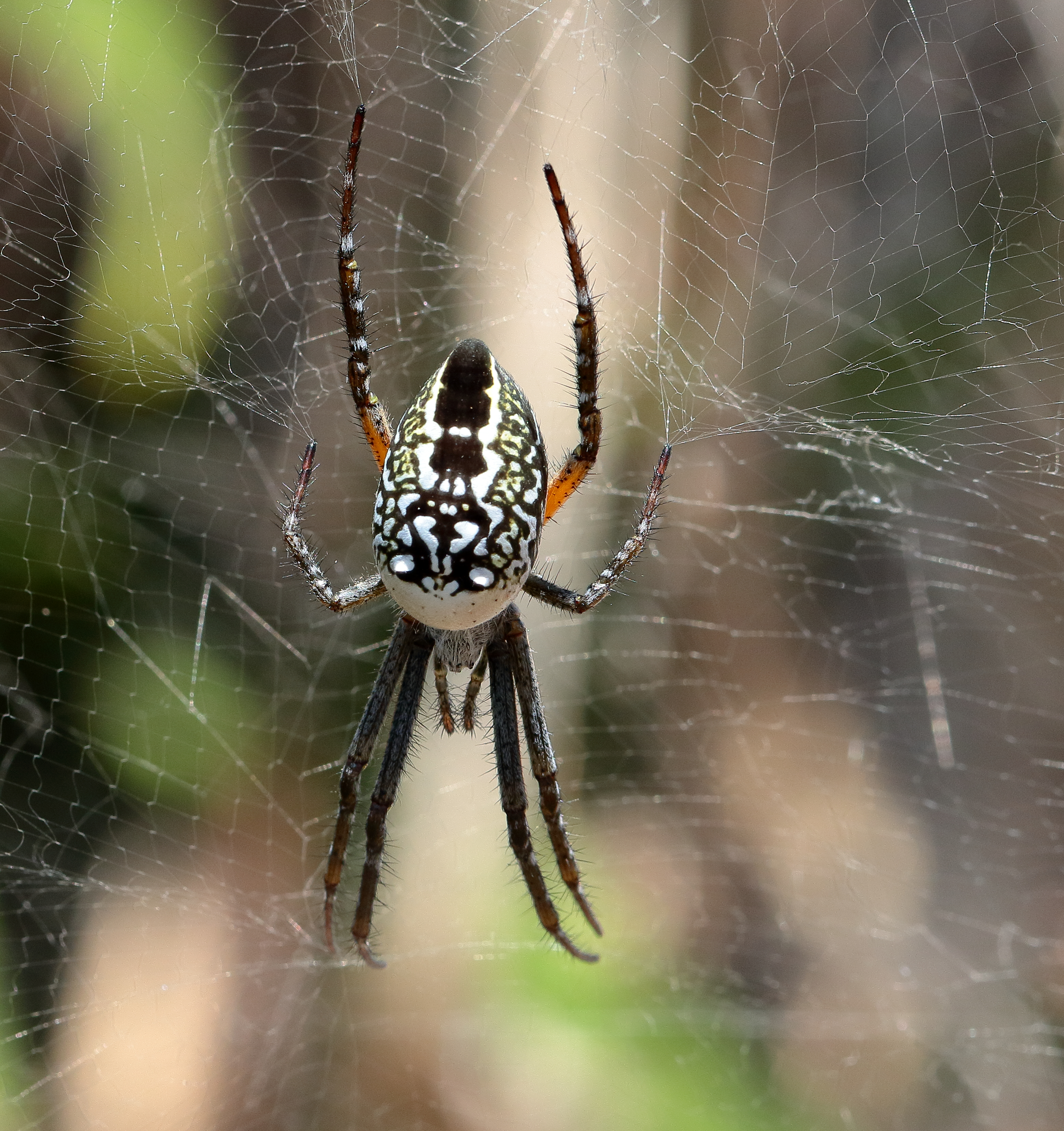
C. moluccensis

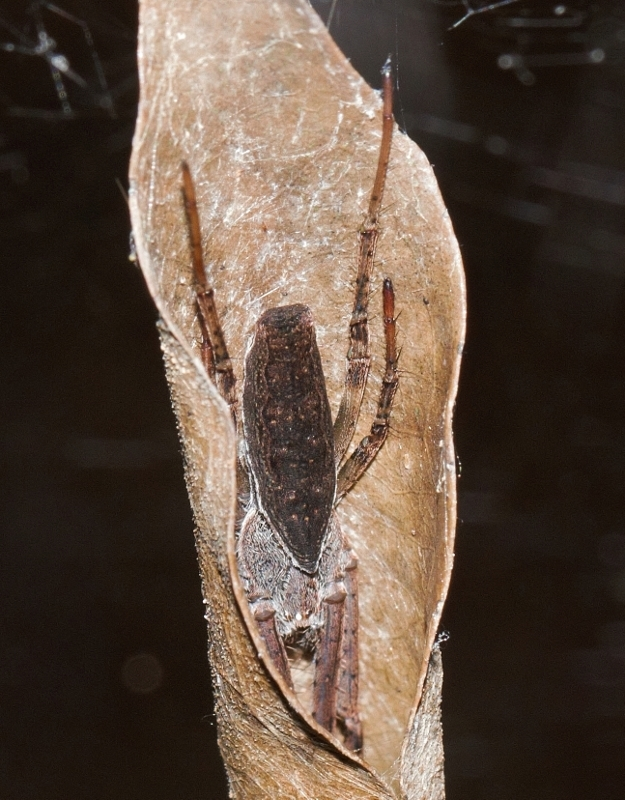
C. petersi

As of November 2026, this genus includes 44 species and three subspecies:

- Cyrtophora admiralia Strand, 1913 – Admiralty Is.
- Cyrtophora beccarii (Thorell, 1878) – Laos, Malaysia to Australia (Northern Territory)
- Cyrtophora bicauda (Saito, 1933) – Taiwan
- Cyrtophora bidenta Tikader, 1970 – India
- Cyrtophora bimaculata Han, Zhang & Zhu, 2010 – China
- Cyrtophora bituberculata Roy, Saha & Raychaudhuri, 2017 – India
- Cyrtophora caudata Bösenberg & Lenz, 1895 – East Africa (region)
- Cyrtophora cephalotes Simon, 1877 – Philippines
- Cyrtophora cicatrosa (Stoliczka, 1869) – Pakistan to Australia (Northern Territory)
- Cyrtophora citricola (Forsskål, 1775) – Southern Europe, Africa, Middle East, Pakistan, India, China, Japan. Introduced to Cuba, Dominican Rep. Costa Rica, Panama, Colombia, Brazil (type species)
  - C. c. lurida Karsch, 1879 – West Africa (region)
  - C. c. minahassae Merian, 1911 – Indonesia (Sulawesi)
  - C. c. obscura Tullgren, 1910 – Tanzania
- Cyrtophora cordiformis (L. Koch, 1871) – Indonesia (New Guinea), Australia (Queensland, Lord Howe Is.)
- Cyrtophora crassipes (Rainbow, 1897) – Australia (New South Wales)
- Cyrtophora cylindroides (Walckenaer, 1841) – China to Australia (Queensland)
- Cyrtophora diazoma (Thorell, 1890) – Indonesia (Sumatra)
- Cyrtophora doriae (Thorell, 1881) – Indonesia (New Guinea), Papua New Guinea (Bismarck Arch.)
- Cyrtophora eczematica (Thorell, 1893) – Sinpapore
- Cyrtophora exanthematica (Doleschall, 1859) – Myanmar to Philippines, Australia (New South Wales)
- Cyrtophora feae (Thorell, 1887) – India to Myanmar
- Cyrtophora forbesi (Thorell, 1890) – Indonesia (Sumatra)
- Cyrtophora gazellae (Karsch, 1878) – Papua New Guinea (New Britain)
- Cyrtophora gemmosa Thorell, 1899 – Cameroon, Equatorial Guinea
- Cyrtophora guangxiensis Yin, Wang, Xie & Peng, 1990 – China
- Cyrtophora hainanensis Yin, Wang, Xie & Peng, 1990 – China
- Cyrtophora hirta L. Koch, 1872 – Australia (Queensland, New South Wales)
- Cyrtophora ikomosanensis (Bösenberg & Strand, 1906) – Taiwan, Japan
- Cyrtophora jabalpurensis Gajbe & Gajbe, 1999 – India
- Cyrtophora koronadalensis Barrion & Litsinger, 1995 – Philippines
- Cyrtophora ksudra Sherriffs, 1928 – India
- Cyrtophora lacunaris Yin, Wang, Xie & Peng, 1990 – China
- Cyrtophora lahirii Biswas & Raychaudhuri, 2004 – Bangladesh
- Cyrtophora larinioides Simon, 1895 – Cameroon
- Cyrtophora limbata (Thorell, 1898) – Myanmar
- Cyrtophora lineata Kulczyński, 1910 – Solomon Islands, Bismarck Arch.
- Cyrtophora moluccensis (Doleschall, 1857) – India to Japan, Indonesia, Papua New Guinea, Australia, Solomon Islands, Palau, Micronesia, Fiji, Tonga, French Polynesia
- Cyrtophora monulfi Chrysanthus, 1960 – Indonesia (New Guinea), Australia (Northern Territory)
- Cyrtophora nareshi Biswas & Raychaudhuri, 2004 – Bangladesh
- Cyrtophora parangexanthematica Barrion & Litsinger, 1995 – Philippines
- Cyrtophora parnasia L. Koch, 1872 – Australia (Western Australia, Tasmania)
- Cyrtophora petersi Karsch, 1878 – Mozambique, South Africa
- Cyrtophora rainbowi (Roewer, 1955) – Australia (New South Wales)
- Cyrtophora sextuberculata Tanikawa & Petcharad, 2015 – Thailand
- Cyrtophora subacalypha (Simon, 1882) – Yemen
- Cyrtophora trigona (L. Koch, 1871) – Australia (Queensland), New Guinea
- Cyrtophora unicolor (Doleschall, 1857) – India, Sri Lanka to Japan, Philippines, New Guinea, Australia (Christmas Is.)
