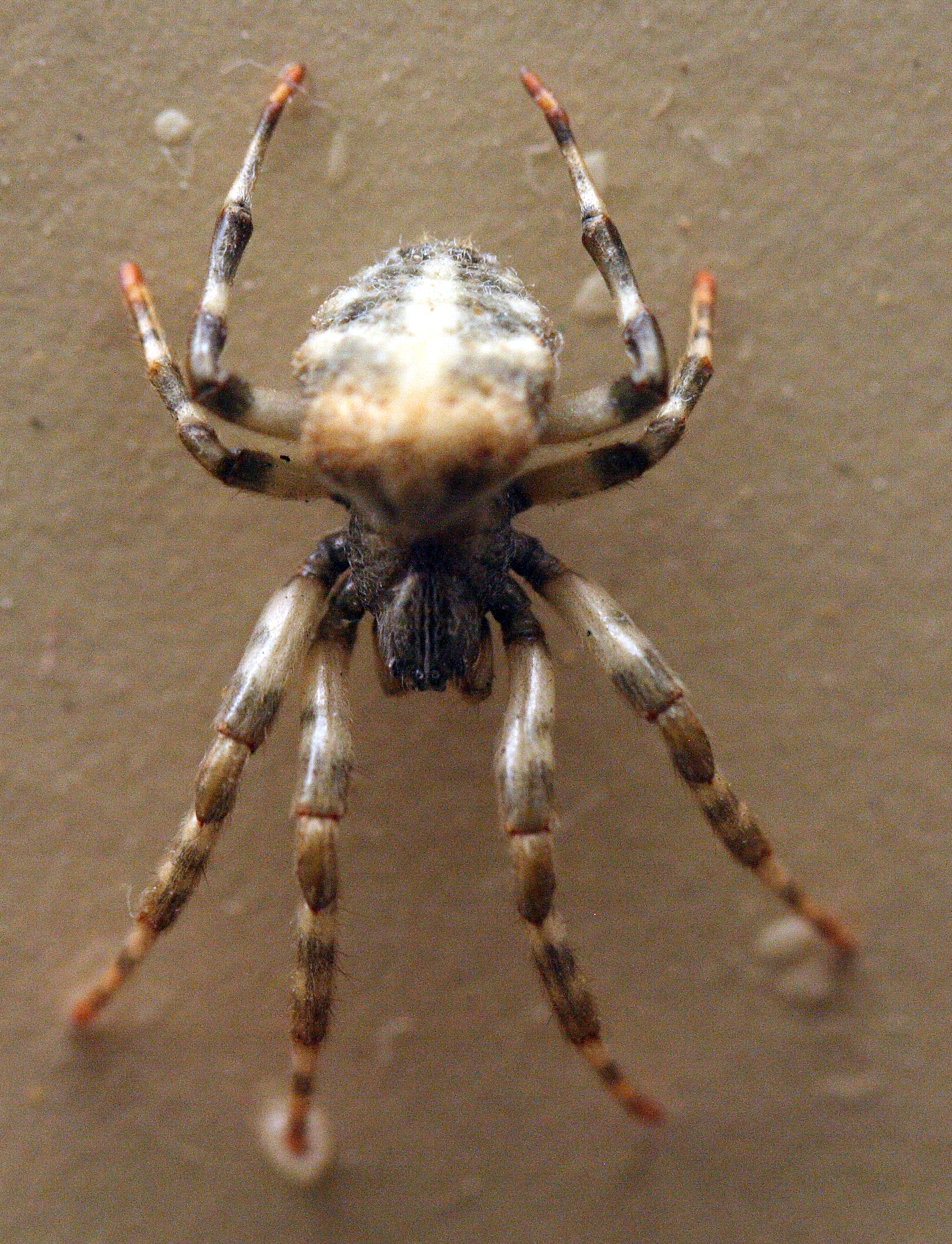

Scientific classification
- Kingdom: Animalia
- Phylum: Arthropoda
- Subphylum: Chelicerata
- Class: Arachnida
- Order: Araneae
- Infraorder: Araneomorphae
- Family: Araneidae
- Genus: Cyrtophora
- Species: C. hirta

Binomial name
- Cyrtophora hirta L.Koch 1872

= Cyrtophora hirta =

Species of spider

Cyrtophora hirta is a species of tent spider found in Australia. The southern range of distribution is near Sydney, though there are New Guinea and Tasmanian records on the Atlas of Living Australia. Ludwig Koch described the species in 1872 from specimens from Bowen, Queensland.

The body length of the female is 10 mm, the male 5 mm. Food is small insects. Many spiders and their tent shaped webs may be found in close proximity. The spider retreats into a white mass of web in the centre, often stained by the remains of prey. The egg sac is plano-convex in shape, 10 mm in diameter, coloured greenish-white. Eggs are pale cream in colour, 0.8 mm in diameter, not glutinous and around 50 eggs per egg sac.

== See also ==
- List of Araneidae genera
