= Manogea =

Scientific classification
- Kingdom: Animalia
- Phylum: Arthropoda
- Subphylum: Chelicerata
- Class: Arachnida
- Order: Araneae
- Infraorder: Araneomorphae
- Family: Araneidae
- Genus: Manogea; Levi, 1997

Type species
- M. porracea (C. L. Koch, 1838)

Species
- M. gaira Levi, 1997 – Colombia, Venezuela; M. porracea (C. L. Koch, 1838) – Panama to Argentina; M. triforma Levi, 1997 – Mexico, Guatemala, Honduras

Genus of spiders

Manogea is a genus of Central and South American orb-weaver spiders first described by Herbert Walter Levi in 1997. As of November 2026 it contains only three species.
