= Carl Ludwig Doleschall =

Carl Ludwig Doleschall (Hungarian: Doleschall Lajos; Slovak: Karol Ľudovít Doležal; born 15 July 1827 – died 26 February 1859) was born in Vág-Újhely, Kingdom of Hungary, Austrian Empire (now Nové Mesto nad Váhom, Slovakia), as the son of the theologian Michael Doleschall, and died in Ambon Island, Moluccas, Dutch East Indies (today in Indonesia) only 31 years old. His name is sometimes also written as "Doleschal".

He studied medicine at the University of Vienna and became a military surgeon for the Dutch army, stationed in Java in 1853. He studied invertebrates and plants extensively, and described many arachnids and insects, notably diptera. In 1852, he published the work Systematisches Verzeichniß der im Kaiserthum Österreich vorkommenden Spinnen. He spent the last half of his life mostly on the island of Ambon.

He was visited by the British naturalist Alfred Russel Wallace in 1857. Shortly after Wallace left, he died of consumption on 26 February 1859. After his death his large collection of beetles went to the Hungarian National Museum in Budapest.
