= Nukuhiva =

Scientific classification
- Kingdom: Animalia
- Phylum: Arthropoda
- Subphylum: Chelicerata
- Class: Arachnida
- Order: Araneae
- Infraorder: Araneomorphae
- Family: Lycosidae
- Genus: Nukuhiva; Berland, 1935
- Species: N. adamsoni

Binomial name
- Nukuhiva adamsoni (Berland, 1933)

Synonyms
- Dolomedes adamsoni Berland, 1933

Genus of spiders

Nukuhiva is a genus of spiders with a single species, Nukuhiva adamsoni, that occurs only on the Marquesas Islands in French Polynesia. It is in the wolf spider family, Lycosidae. It has been found on Nuku Hiva and on Ua Huka, a smaller island about 25 km (16 mi) to the east.

== Taxonomy ==
The genus was first described by Lucien Berland in 1935 and is named after the island Nuku Hiva in the Marquesas Islands. Berland named several genera after islands in the Pacific Ocean during the 1930s. Other names derived from islands in the Marquesas are Uapou and Uahuka.

It was originally included in the family Pisauridae, though the shape of the male and female genitalia place it in the family Lycosidae (subfamily Lycosinae).
