= Plebs (spider) =

- P. eburnus on web

Scientific classification
- Kingdom: Animalia
- Phylum: Arthropoda
- Subphylum: Chelicerata
- Class: Arachnida
- Order: Araneae
- Infraorder: Araneomorphae
- Family: Araneidae
- Genus: Plebs; Joseph & Framenau, 2012

Type species
- P. eburnus (Keyserling, 1886)

Species
- 22, see text

Genus of spiders

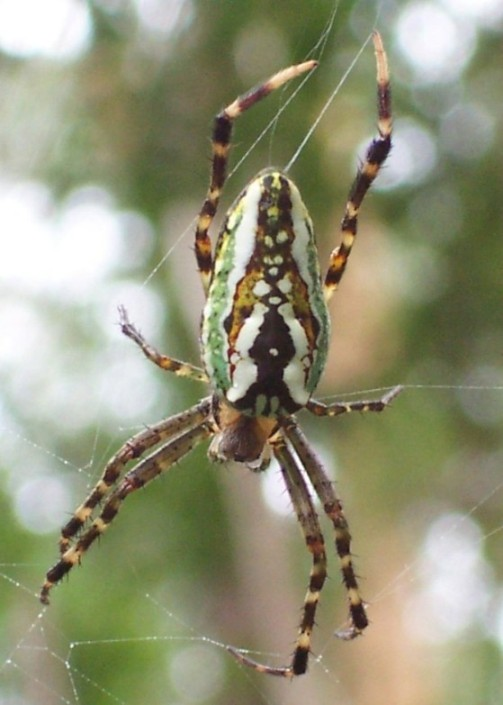
Plebs bradleyi

Plebs is a genus of orb-weaver spiders first described by M. M. Joseph & V. W. Framenau in 2012. Though many of its species have been moved around, a 2012 taxonomic revision suggested that these spiders comprise a monophyletic genus of closely related spiders that evolved in Australia and, through subsequent movements, spread into parts of Asia and Pacific islands.

== Etymology ==
"Plebs" is Latin for "common people" and refers to this genus being common in Australia.

== Description ==
Plebs can be recognised by the unique pattern on the underside of the abdomen: a light inverted U shape, followed by two light spots anterolateral to the spinnerets. Spiders of this genus have a typical "eriophorine" genital morphology: the male pedipalp has a paramedian apophysis and an elongated transverse median apophysis, while the female epigyne has an elongated scape without terminal pockets.

== Behaviour ==
These spiders are mainly diurnal, unlike most Araneinae which are mainly nocturnal. They build regular orb-webs with vertical stabilimenta (web decorations used by this and other diurnal orb-weavers). Their webs are generally built in grass and low shrubs.

== Species ==
As of April 2019 it contains twenty-two species. Seven are found in Australia, thirteen in Asia, one on New Caledonia, and one endemic to Vanuatu.

- Plebs arleneae Joseph & Framenau, 2012 – Australia (Queensland, New South Wales)
- Plebs arletteae Joseph & Framenau, 2012 – Australia (Lord Howe Is.)
- Plebs astridae (Strand, 1917) – China, Korea, Taiwan, Japan
- Plebs aurea (Saito, 1934) – Japan
- Plebs baotianmanensis (Hu, Wang & Wang, 1991) – China
- Plebs bradleyi (Keyserling, 1887) – Southeastern Australia, Tasmania
- Plebs cyphoxis (Simon, 1908) – Australia (Western Australia, South Australia)
- Plebs eburnus (Keyserling, 1886) (type) – Eastern Australia, Tasmania
- Plebs himalayaensis (Tikader, 1975) – India
- Plebs mitratus (Simon, 1895) – India
- Plebs neocaledonicus (Berland, 1924) – New Caledonia
- Plebs oculosus (Zhu & Song, 1994) – China
- Plebs opacus Joseph & Framenau, 2012 – Vanuatu
- Plebs patricius Joseph & Framenau, 2012 – Australia (Victoria, Tasmania)
- Plebs plumiopedellus (Yin, Wang & Zhang, 1987) – China, Taiwan
- Plebs poecilus (Zhu & Wang, 1994) – China
- Plebs rosemaryae Joseph & Framenau, 2012 – Australia (Queensland, Norfolk Is.)
- Plebs sachalinensis (Saito, 1934) – Russia (Far East), China, Korea, Japan
- Plebs salesi Joseph & Framenau, 2012 – New Guinea
- Plebs sebastiani Joseph & Framenau, 2012 – Philippines
- Plebs tricentrus (Zhu & Song, 1994) – China
- Plebs yanbaruensis (Tanikawa, 2000) – Japan
