= Hokatu =

- Village
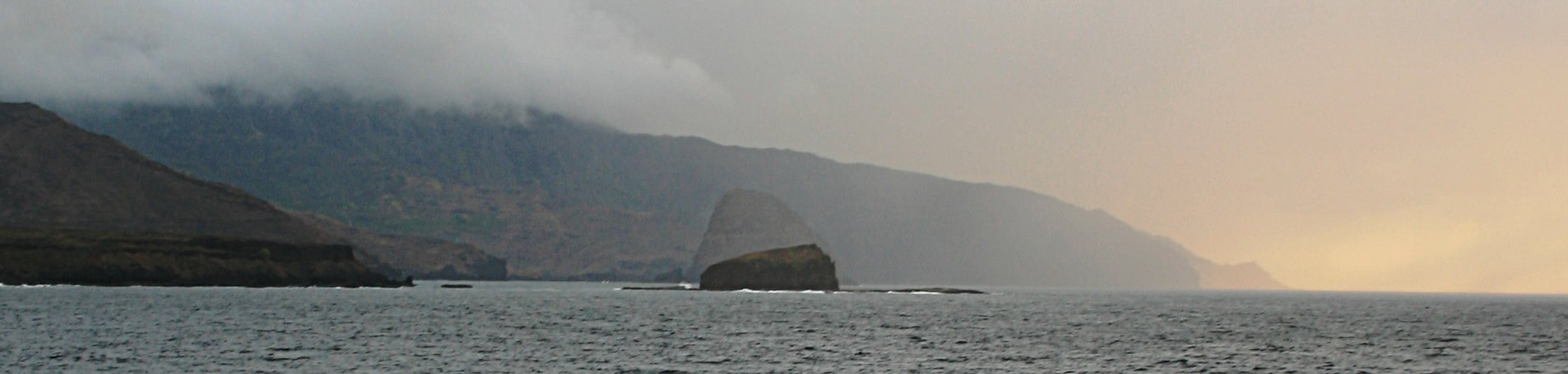
- Coastline in the area

- Location in the Marquesas Islands
- Coordinates: 8°55′48″S 139°31′35″W
- Country: France
- Overseas collectivity: French Polynesia
- Territory: Marquesas Islands
- Island: Ua Huka

Hokatu is a village on the island of Ua Huka in the Marquesas Islands in French Polynesia. It is about 3 kilometres (1.9 mi) to the southwest of Hane. Motuhane Island is off the coast of Hokatu.

Hokatu is known for its arts and crafts, particularly woodcarvings. Three museums are opened during the tourist season, and they include the Hokatu Petroglyph Museum. The guesthouse in the village is the Chez Maurice et Delphine, which contains five small bungalows.

== Geography and wildlife ==
Hokatu is the smallest of the three villages on the island, and lies about 3 kilometres (1.9 mi) to the southeast of Hane. Its bay has good anchorage in a small natural harbor and is visited by the Aranui 3. There is a small rocky island nearby, Motuhane Island. There is a hiking route from Hane through Hokatu, which then extends into mango and pandanus forest.

There are cliffs along the coastline, and a notable birdwatching point. Birds found here include the Lesser Frigatebird, Rock Pigeon, Zebra Dove, Marquesan Swiftlet, Wandering Tattler, White Tern, Sooty Tern, Brown Noddy, Black Noddy and Blue-gray Noddy.

== Culture and landmarks ==
Hokatu is well known for its woodcarvers and contains a craft center where the inhabitants sell their items. Three museums are open during tourist season. One of the museums is the Hokatu Petroglyph Museum, which contains an array of petroglyphs unearthed on the island of Ua Huka.

The guesthouse in the village is the Chez Maurice et Delphine, which contains five small bungalows, one of which is called the Mate Otemanu. Nearby the village, at the bottom of the valley, there lie the foundations of an ancient settlement known as a paepae.
