= Uapou =

Scientific classification
- Kingdom: Animalia
- Phylum: Arthropoda
- Subphylum: Chelicerata
- Class: Arachnida
- Order: Araneae
- Infraorder: Araneomorphae
- Family: Linyphiidae
- Genus: Uapou; Berland, 1935
- Species: U. maculata

Binomial name
- Uapou maculata Berland, 1935

Monotypic genus of spiders

Uapou is a monotypic genus of South Pacific sheet weaver spiders containing the single species, Uapou maculata. It was first described by Lucien Berland in 1935, and is found on Ua Pou, one of the Marquesas Islands. It was transferred to the family Symphytognathidae by H. W. Levi in 1972, but this was rejected by Brignoli in 1980. The World Spider Catalog places it in the family Linyphiidae.

== Nomenclature ==
The genus is named after the island Ua Pou on the Marquesas Islands. The describer, Lucien Berland, named several genera after islands in the Pacific Ocean during the 1930s, including Uahuka and Nukuhiva. The species name is derived from Latin maculata, meaning "spotted".
