= Ohu (disambiguation) =

Ohu is a Māori word meaning 'communal work group'. Ohu may also refer to:

- Õhu, a village in Lääneranna Parish, Pärnu County, in southwestern Estonia
- Ōu Mountains, in Japan
- Ohu University, a private university in Kōriyama, Japan
- Bayo Ohu (1964–2009), a Nigerian journalist
- Nestor Ohu (born 1962), a politician of the Marquesas Islands
- Ohu Ou (born 1992), a Chinese actor and singer
- ohu, the ISO 639-3 code for the Old Hungarian language
- Ocean heat uptake, a property to measure the amount of heat energy in the ocean
