= Typhistes =

Scientific classification
- Kingdom: Animalia
- Phylum: Arthropoda
- Subphylum: Chelicerata
- Class: Arachnida
- Order: Araneae
- Infraorder: Araneomorphae
- Family: Linyphiidae
- Genus: Typhistes; Simon, 1894

Type species
- T. comatus Simon, 1894

Species
- 4, see text

Genus of spiders

Typhistes is a genus of sheet weavers that was first described by Eugène Louis Simon in 1894.

== Species ==
As of June 2019 it contains four species:

- Typhistes antilope Simon, 1894 – Sri Lanka
- Typhistes comatus Simon, 1894 (type) – Sri Lanka
- Typhistes elephas Berland, 1922 – Ethiopia
- Typhistes gloriosus Jocqué, 1984 – South Africa
