= Holocneminus =

Scientific classification
- Kingdom: Animalia
- Phylum: Arthropoda
- Subphylum: Chelicerata
- Class: Arachnida
- Order: Araneae
- Infraorder: Araneomorphae
- Family: Pholcidae
- Genus: Holocneminus; Berland, 1942

Type species
- H. piritarsis Berland, 1942

Species
- H. multiguttatus (Simon, 1905) – Sri Lanka to Malaysia, Indonesia (Sulawesi); H. piritarsis Berland, 1942 – Samoa, French Polynesia (Marquesas Is., Austral Is.), Henderson Is., Marshall Is.; H. samanggi Lan & Li, 2021 – Indonesia (Sulawesi)

Genus of spiders

Holocneminus is a genus of cellar spiders that was first described by Lucien Berland in 1942. As of November 2024 it contains only three species, found only in Oceania and Asia: H. multiguttatus, H. piritarsis, and H. samanggi.

== See also ==
- List of Pholcidae species
