= Uahuka =

Scientific classification
- Kingdom: Animalia
- Phylum: Arthropoda
- Subphylum: Chelicerata
- Class: Arachnida
- Order: Araneae
- Infraorder: Araneomorphae
- Family: Linyphiidae
- Genus: Uahuka; Berland, 1935

Type species
- U. spinifrons Berland, 1935

Species
- 2, see text

Genus of spiders

Uahuka is a genus of South Pacific sheet weavers endemic to the Marquesas Islands that was first described by Lucien Berland in 1935. It was transferred to the family Symphytognathidae in 1972, but the transfer was rejected in 1980.

The genus is named after Ua Huka on the Marquesas Islands. It is one of several genera that Lucien Berland named after islands in the Pacific Ocean during the 1930s. Other names derived from islands in the Marquesas are Uapou and Nukuhiva. The specific name of U. affinis is derived from the Latin affinis, meaning "allied, related". Spinifrons translates to "spiny front".

While both species call the Marquesas Islands group home, each is endemic to a specific island: U. spinifrons has only been found on Ua Huka and U. affinis has only been found on Hiva Oa, a larger island about 50 kilometres (31 mi) southeast of Ua Huka.

== Species ==
As of September 2020 it contains two species:

- Uahuka affinis Berland, 1935 − Marquesas Is.
- Uahuka spinifrons Berland, 1935 − Marquesas Is.
