= Hane, Marquesas Islands =

Village in French Polynesia

Hane
- Village
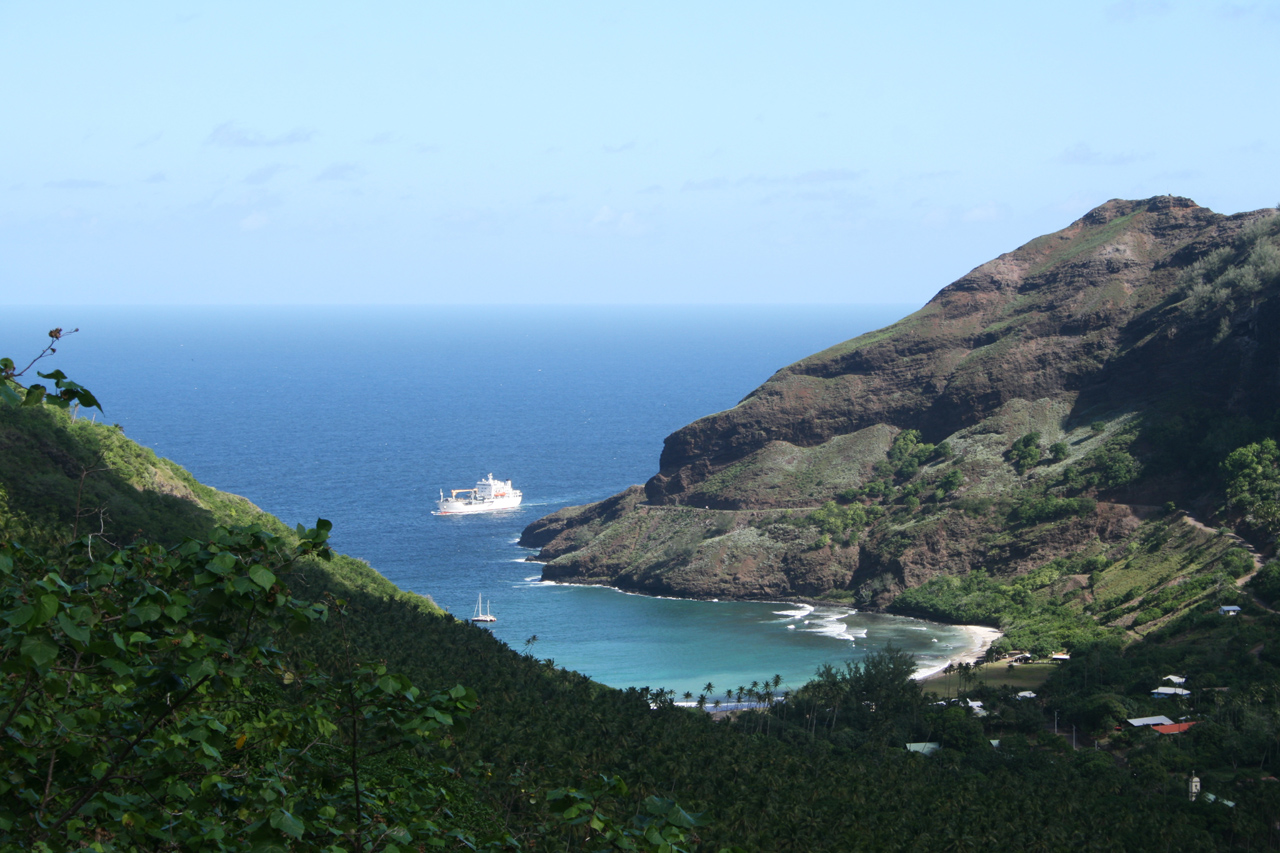

- Location in the Marquesas Islands
- Coordinates: 8°55′23″S 139°32′06″W
- Country: France
- Overseas collectivity: French Polynesia
- Territory: Marquesas Islands
- Island: Ua Huka

Hane is the largest settlement on the island of Ua Huka, in the Marquesas Islands of French Polynesia. Hane, a notable archaeological site, has a smaller population than the capital of Vaipae'e.

== Geography ==
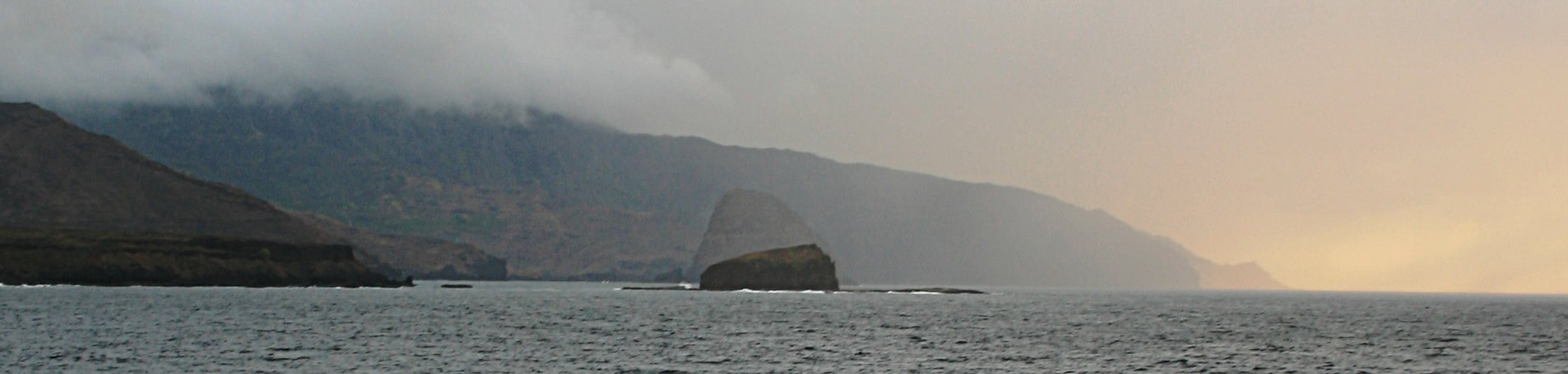
Southern coast of the island of Ua Huka.

It is located between the airport and the village of Hokatu, to the southwest of Mount Hitikau. Mount Hitikau (884 m) is situated to the northeast.

== Archaeological inferences ==
The archaeological sites of Tehavea and Meiaute are within walking distance of the village. The area was first excavated by Yosihiko H. Sinoto in 1964–65. His excavations revealed more than 12,000 bird bones, of which nearly 10,000 reportedly belonged to about seven species of shearwaters and petrels. During archaeological investigations in Hane, sherds were also found below a rock surface and were initially dated to 300-600 AD. However, radiocarbon dating indicated an occupation period anywhere between 900 and 1200 AD.

Further investigations were conducted at Hane from the 1990s for a period of about 20 years. The excavations of 2009 revealed that the oldest occupational date for the archipelago, including French Polynesia, was around 1000 AD, when people depended on marine resources. However, around 1200 AD, there was a shift in the occupational pattern, with dwellings made of perishable materials built over stone plinths. Thereafter, the site was deserted as the population moved to the valleys, and from 1200 to 1400 AD the coastal areas including Hane were used mainly as burial grounds.

== Landmarks ==
The Sea Museum (Le musée de la Mer) contains exhibits of traditional tools used for fishing, hooks, explanations on old fishing techniques, a collection of canoes, and a crafts centre. Auberge Hitikau is a small hostel and restaurant, named after the mountain. It contains four double rooms There is also a hospital.

== Bibliography ==
- Stanley, David (2004). Moon Handbooks South Pacific. David Stanley. p. 279. ISBN 978-1-56691-411-6.
