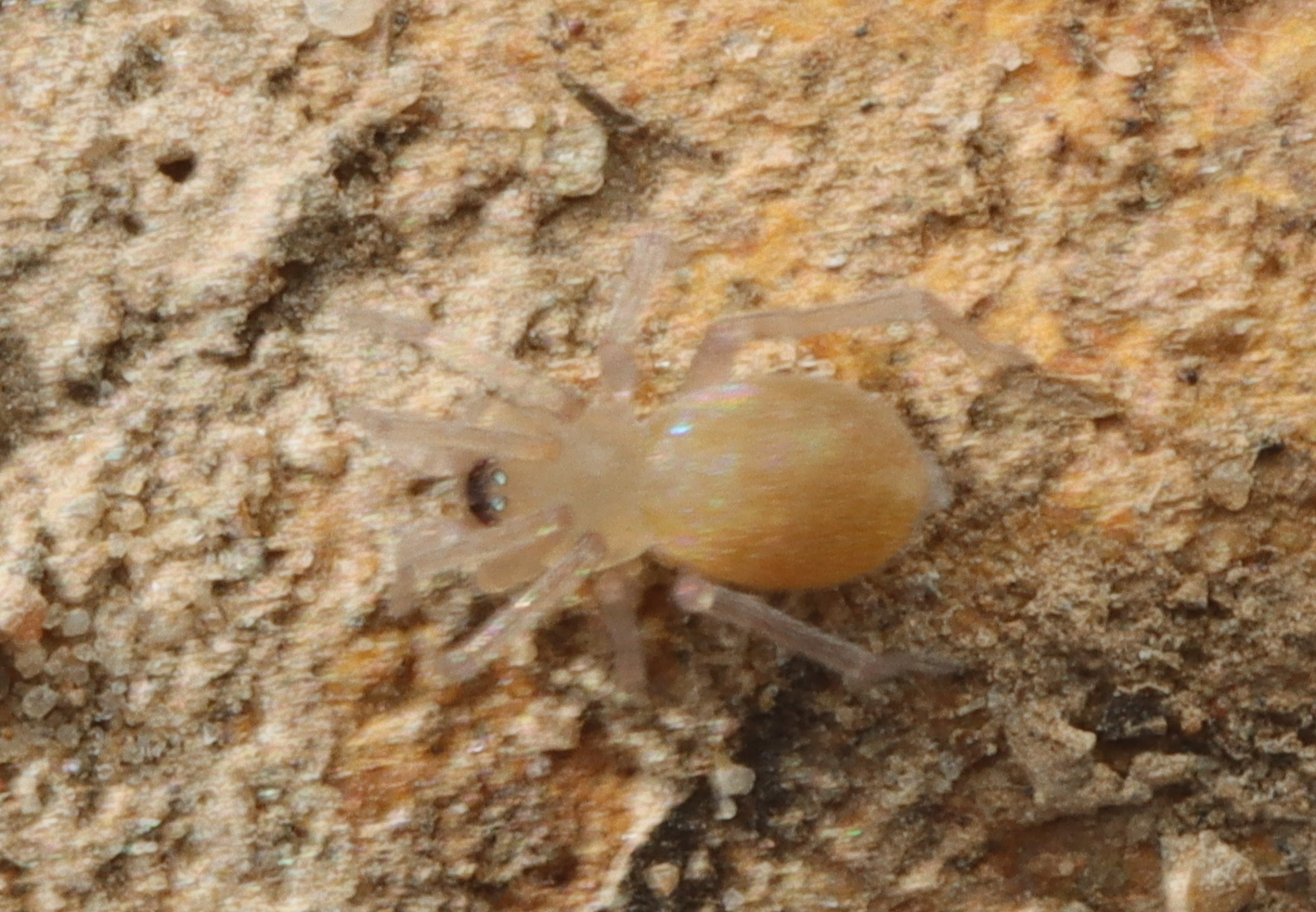
- Leptodrassex capensis

Scientific classification
- Kingdom: Animalia
- Phylum: Arthropoda
- Subphylum: Chelicerata
- Class: Arachnida
- Order: Araneae
- Infraorder: Araneomorphae
- Family: Gnaphosidae
- Genus: Leptodrassex; Murphy, 2007

Type species
- L. simoni (Dalmas, 1919)

Species
- 5, see text

= Leptodrassex =

Genus of spiders

Leptodrassex is a genus of ground spiders that was first described by J. Murphy in 2007.

== Species ==
As of October 2022 there are five species recognised in the genus Leptodrassex:

- Leptodrassex algericus (Dalmas, 1919) – Algeria, Libya
- Leptodrassex capensis Haddad & Booysen, 2022 – South Africa
- Leptodrassex hylaestomachi (Berland, 1934) – Canary Is.
- Leptodrassex murphyi Haddad & Booysen, 2022 – Mozambique, South Africa
- Leptodrassex simoni (Dalmas, 1919) (type) – Portugal, Spain, France, Lebanon
