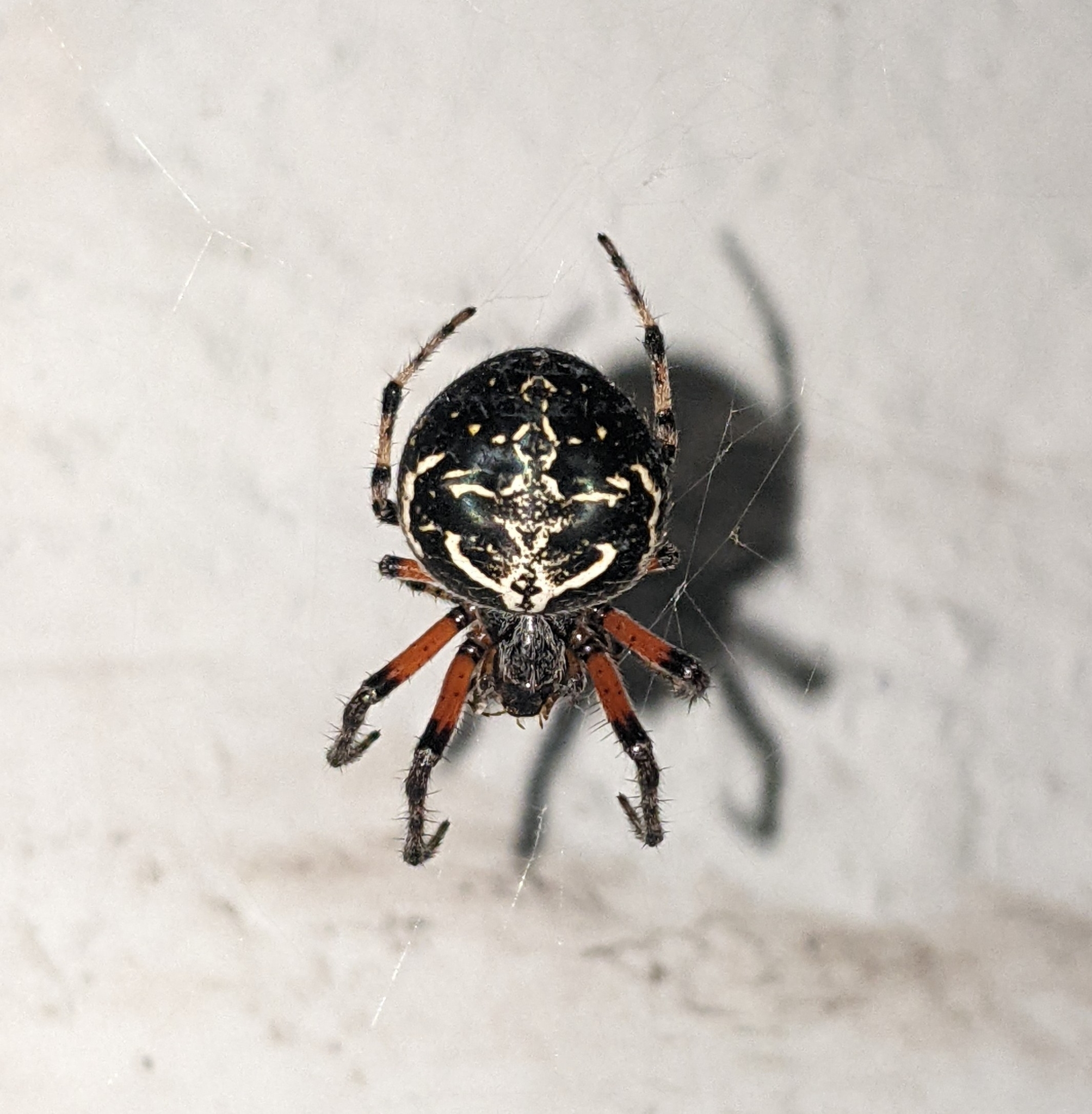
- female from Ecuador

Scientific classification
- Kingdom: Animalia
- Phylum: Arthropoda
- Subphylum: Chelicerata
- Class: Arachnida
- Order: Araneae
- Infraorder: Araneomorphae
- Family: Araneidae
- Genus: Araneus
- Species: A. granadensis

Binomial name
- Araneus granadensis (Keyserling, 1864)

Synonyms
- Epeira granadensis Keyserling, 1864; Neoscona granadensis Petrunkevitch, 1930; Araneus riveti Berland, 1913

= Araneus granadensis =

Species of orb-weaver spider

Araneus granadensis is a species of orb-weaver spider in the family Araneidae. It is found from Venezuela to Peru.

== Taxonomy ==
The species was first described by Eugen von Keyserling in 1864 as Epeira granadensis from specimens collected in Santa Fe de Bogotá, Colombia (then United States of Colombia). In 1913, Berland described Araneus riveti from Ecuador, which was later synonymized with A. granadensis by Dupérré in 2023.

== Distribution ==
A. granadensis has been recorded from Venezuela, Colombia, Ecuador, and Peru.

== Description ==
Based on Keyserling's original description, the cephalothorax is usually dark brown with yellow lateral margins, sometimes with a lighter head region, and covered with long, fine hairs. It is not quite half as wide at the front as at the back and somewhat longer than wide. The head region is clearly separated from the rounded posterior part by lateral grooves.

The abdomen has a short, egg-shaped form, projects somewhat beyond the cephalothorax at the front and is narrower at the back. The coloration varies from light brown to black, and the pattern is often very indistinct. In clearly marked specimens, there is a light longitudinal band on the upper surface that is crossed in the middle by two short bands of the same color, giving the appearance of a double cross. On each side runs a narrow band that divides into two branches in its posterior half. Additionally, there is often a series of yellow spots on each side, visible from the rear crossband to the end of the abdomen.

Males are 5-8.5 mm in length and are considerably more slender and smaller than females, with proportionally much longer legs. The coloration is much lighter, at least in the four specimens examined by Keyserling. The abdomen is much longer and more densely haired, and the spines on the legs are thicker and larger.
