= Hitikau =

Mountain in French Polynesia

Coordinates: 8°54′20″S 139°31′17″W

Hitikau is a volcanic mountain of Ua Huka, in the Marquesas Islands of Polynesia. It has an elevation of 884 metres (2,900 ft), the highest point of the island, and lies to the northeast of the village of Hane.

== Auberge Hitikau ==
There is a small hostel and restaurant at the foot of the mountain in the village of Auberge Hitikau, named after the mountain. It contains four double rooms, with an eatery noted for its goat and pork dishes and kaveka omelettes.
