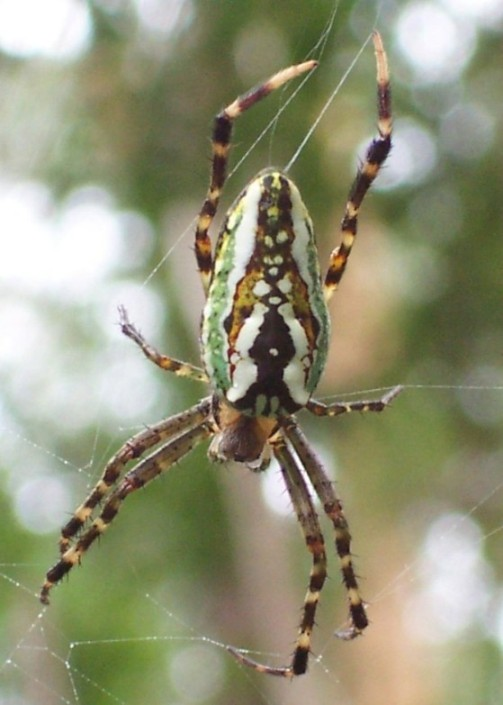

Scientific classification
- Kingdom: Animalia
- Phylum: Arthropoda
- Subphylum: Chelicerata
- Class: Arachnida
- Order: Araneae
- Infraorder: Araneomorphae
- Family: Araneidae
- Genus: Plebs
- Species: P. bradleyi

Binomial name
- Plebs bradleyi (Keyserling, 1887)

Synonyms
- Epeira bradleyi Keyserling, 1887; Epeira variabilis Rainbow, 1897 (preoccupied); Araenus concinnus Rainbow, 1900 (replacement name for E. variabilis)

= Plebs bradleyi =

Enamelled spider

Species of spider

Plebs bradleyi, synonym Araneus bradleyi, is a spider in the orb-weaver family Araneidae. Known as the enamelled spider, it is a common Australian spider. It occurs in Tasmania, New South Wales, Queensland and Victoria.

== Description and habit ==
The body length of males is 8 to 9 mm and females from 14 to 18 mm. The abdomen has an enamelled appearance which varies in different parts of the country. In some areas different forms appear side by side. Some are a pure jade colour. The egg sac is round in shape, flat on the bottom where it is fastened down, of red brown silk of a woolly appearance. The eggs are 1 mm in diameter, in a sticky mass.

The enamelled spider hunts in the web at night, and often retreats to surrounding vegetation in the day. Their prey is small flying insects caught in a sloping orb web, around one metre above ground level.

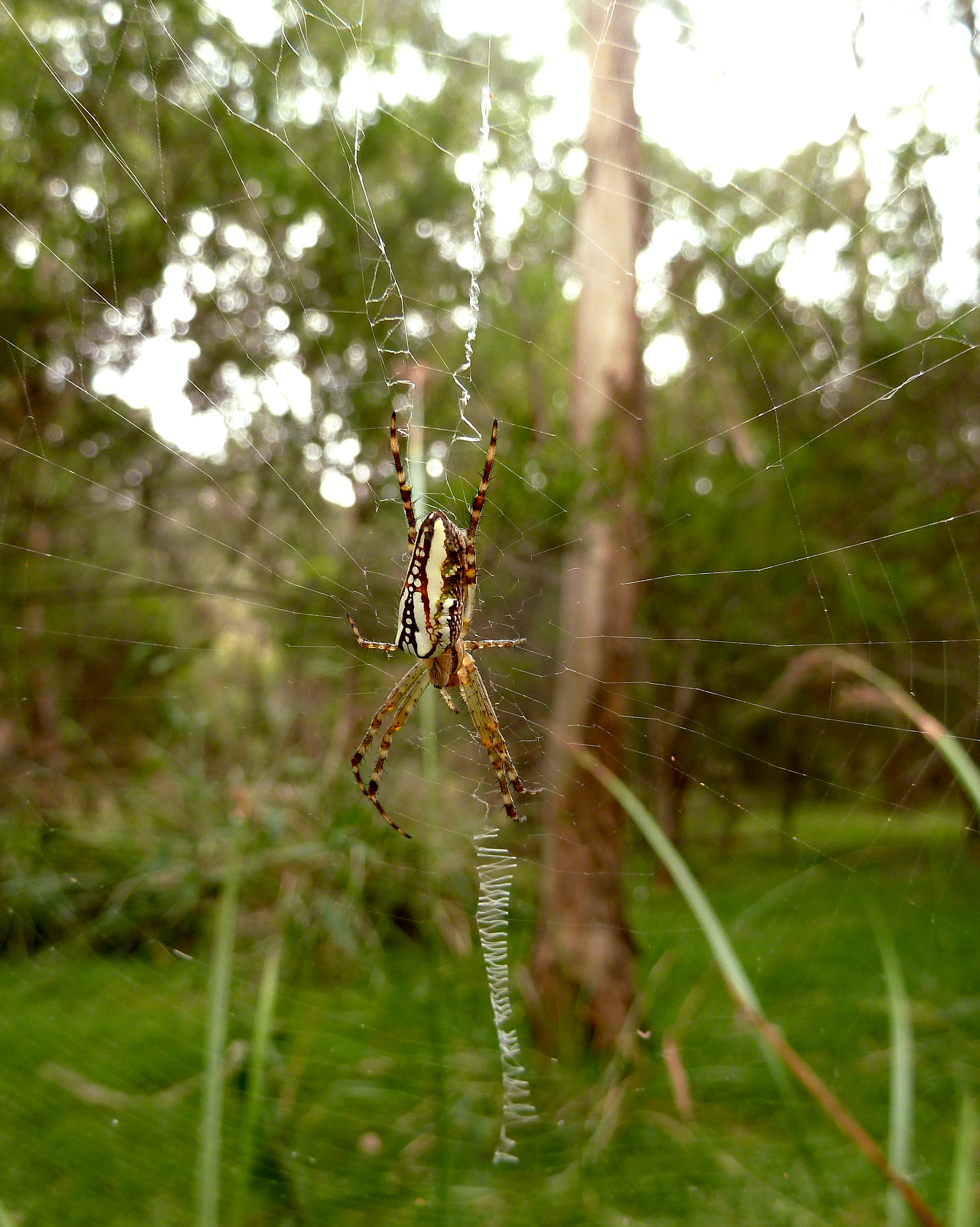
Female with web decoration (Tallarook/Victoria, Australia)

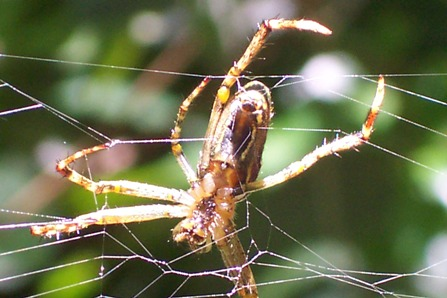
underside, female

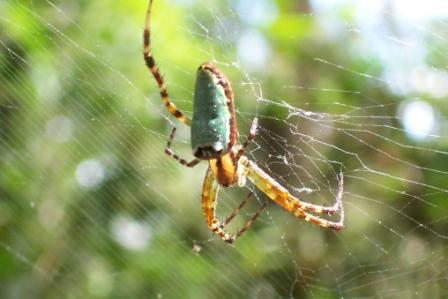
Jade form

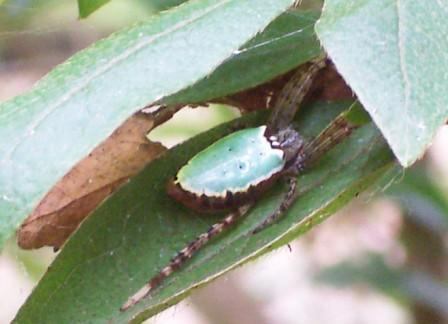
In an Azalea leaf
