= Plebs eburnus =

- Female on web.

Scientific classification
- Kingdom: Animalia
- Phylum: Arthropoda
- Subphylum: Chelicerata
- Class: Arachnida
- Order: Araneae
- Infraorder: Araneomorphae
- Family: Araneidae
- Genus: Plebs
- Species: P. eburnus

Binomial name
- Plebs eburnus Keyserling, 1886

Synonyms
- Epeira eburna Keyserling, 1886; Epeira rubripunctata Rainbow, 1893; Epeira sinuosus Rainbow, 1893; Araneus eburnus (Keyserling, 1886); Araneus eburneus (Keyserling, 1886) (misspelling); Aranea eburnea (Keyserling, 1886) (misspelling); Aranea rubripunctata (Rainbow, 1893); Aranea sinuosa (Rainbow, 1893); Araneus rubripunctatus Rainbow, 1893

Species of spider

The spider species Plebs eburnus is commonly referred to as the eastern grass orb-weaver or the eastern bush orb-weaver, and sometimes more simply as the bush orb-weaver. It is an orb-weaver spider from the family Araneidae endemic to Australia. It is a very common spider with distinctive white markings (although these marking can be quite variable), which give it the species name eburnus pertaining to ivory. It is found in scrub and tall grasses where the female constructs a vertical web usually no more than 2 metres (6 ft 7 in) from the ground, and stays there day and night. The web of some of these spiders has been seen to be decorated with nearly vertical stabilimentum (like a clockface at 5 minutes to 5 or its mirror image). The stabilimentum of the related P. cyphoxis is usually observed vertical (like a clockface at 6 o'clock).

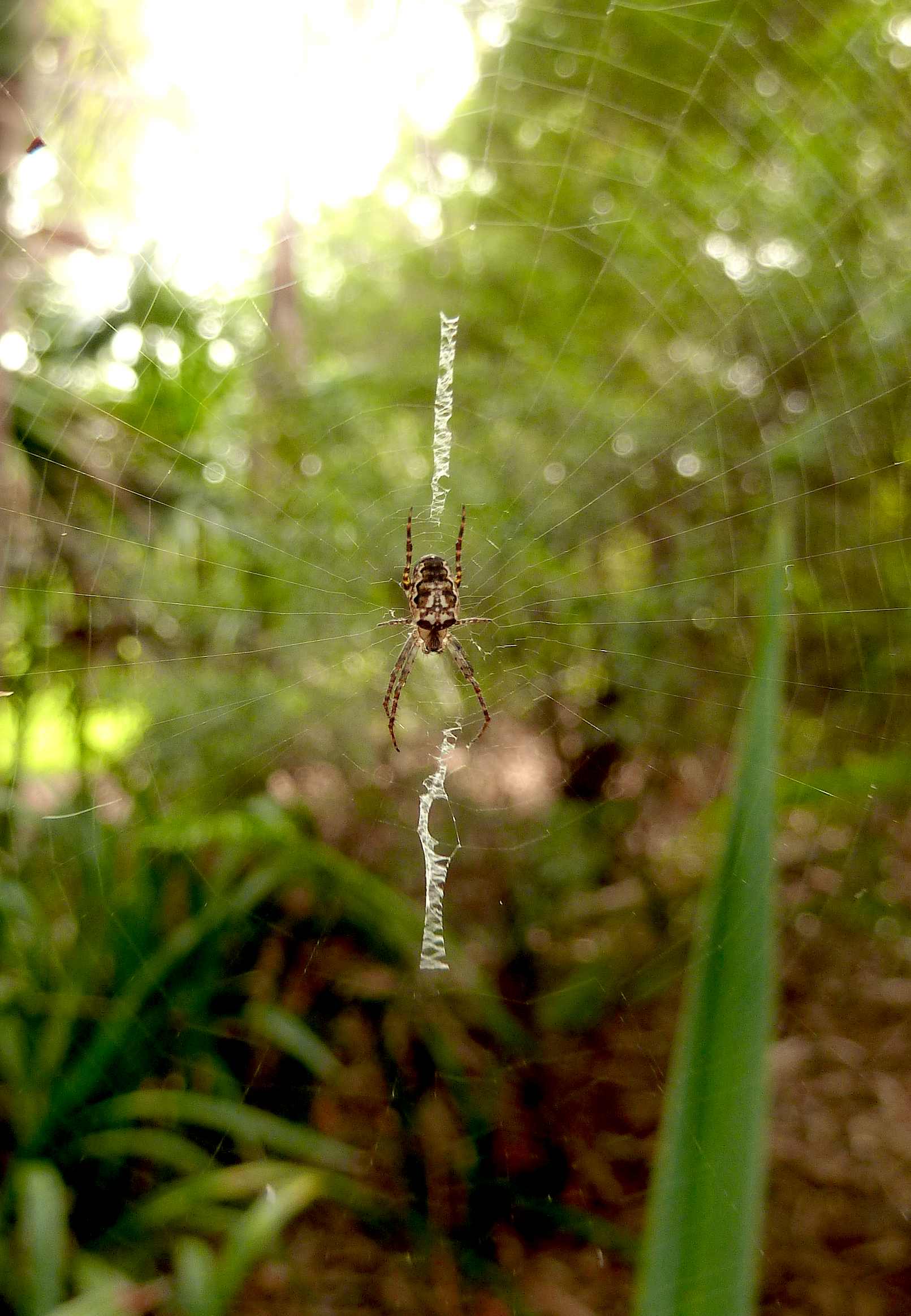
Female with typical web decoration (Royal Park, Melbourne/Victoria, Australia)

== Description ==
On the underside of the abdomen, along with other members of the genus Plebs, there is a characteristic U-shaped white marking with two white spots either side of the spinnerets. The females, as with most spiders, are larger than the males and are around 8mm in length, compared to just 5mm in length for the males.

== Taxonomy ==
The species was first described by Eugen von Keyserling in 1886 as Epeira eburna. It was transferred to the genus Araneus and then in 2012 into a newly described genus Plebs. It is closely related to the western bush orb-weaver, P. cyphoxis.

== Distribution ==
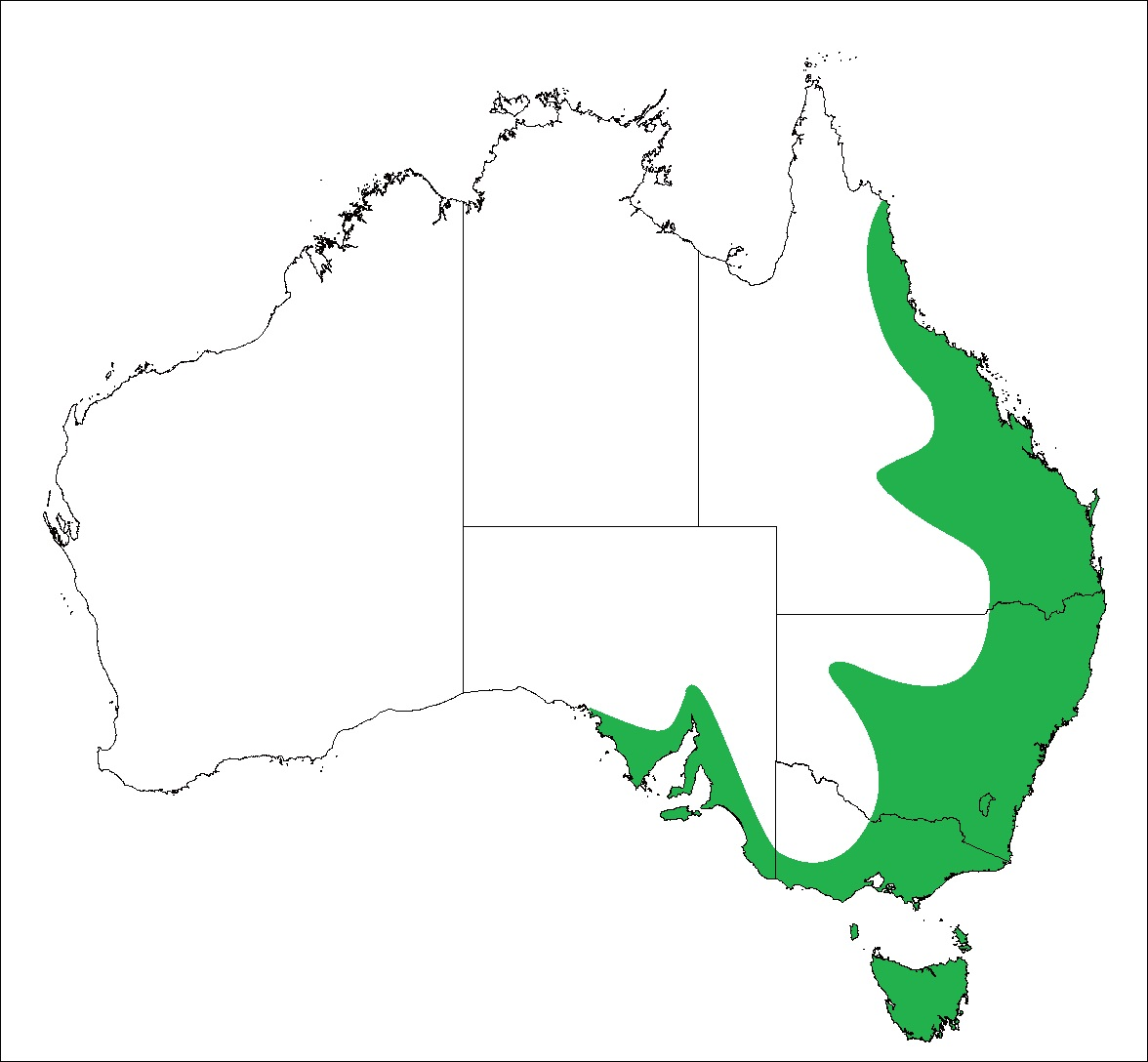
Approximate range of P. eburnus created from field record locations in Joseph & Framenau 2012

P. eburnus can be found in Queensland, New South Wales, Victoria, Tasmania, Australian Capital Territory and South Australia. Some rare occurrences have been observed in Western Australia although this is not part of the typical range of this species. The ranges of this species and P. cyphoxis overlap in South Australia.
