= Vaipae'e =

- Village
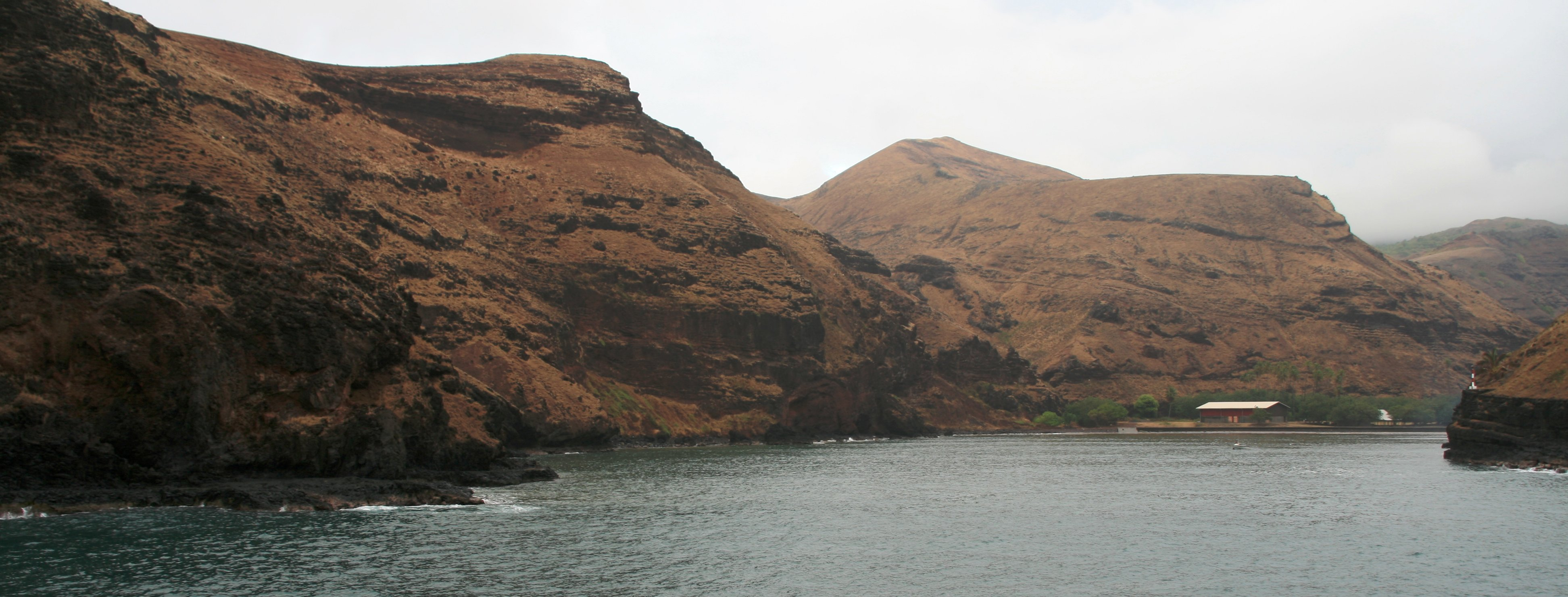
- Baie Invisible, looking towards Vaipae'e

- Location in the Marquesas Islands
- Coordinates: 8°55′44″S 139°34′37″W
- Country: France
- Overseas collectivity: French Polynesia
- Territory: Marquesas Islands
- Island: Ua Huka

Vaipae'e is the most populous settlement on the island of Ua Huka, in the Marquesas Islands of French Polynesia. It is the chief town in the commune of Ua-Huka, and is located in the southern part of the island, to the northwest of Ua Huka Airport. It sits overlooking Baie Invisible.

== Landmarks ==
The village contains a town hall, a post office, an infirmary, a nursery and primary school, and the Marquesas Archaeological Museum (known as the Musée Communal de Uahuka). Inaugurated in 1989, the museum contains many traditional handicrafts and everyday objects: tikis, wood carvings, tapas, bracelets, earrings, paddles, puzzles, adzes, and the reconstruction of a former habitat in a cave.
