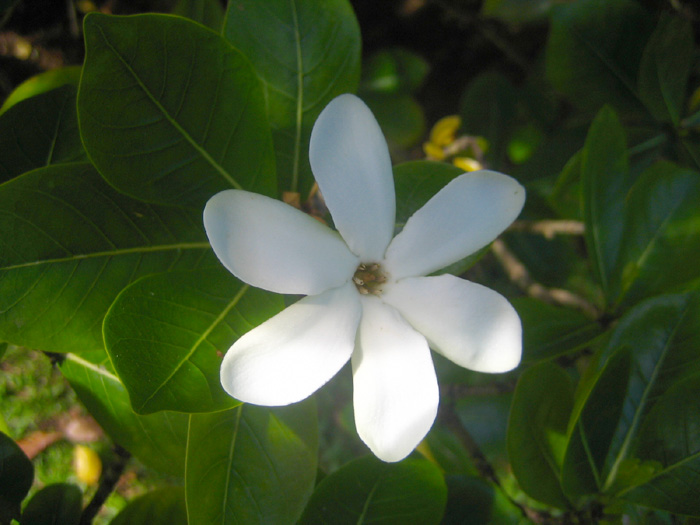

Scientific classification
- Kingdom: Plantae
- Clade: Tracheophytes
- Clade: Angiosperms
- Clade: Eudicots
- Clade: Asterids
- Order: Gentianales
- Family: Rubiaceae
- Genus: Gardenia
- Species: G. taitensis

Binomial name
- Gardenia taitensis DC.

Synonyms
- Gardenia weissichii H.St.John

= Gardenia taitensis =

Species of plant

Gardenia taitensis, also called Tahitian gardenia or tiaré flower, is a species of plant in the family Rubiaceae. It is an evergreen tropical shrub that grows to 4 m (10 ft) tall and has glossy dark green leaves that are 5–16 cm (2–6 in) long and are oppositely arranged along the stem. The flower is creamy white and pinwheel-shaped with 5–9 lobes, each 2–4 cm (0.8–2 in) long and fragrant. Native to the highland shores of the South Pacific, it has the distinction of being one of the few cultivated plants native to Polynesia. It is the national flower of French Polynesia and the Cook Islands.

The name Tahitian gardenia is somewhat a misnomer because it is neither native nor naturalized in Tahiti. The first acceptable scientific name for the plant was based on Tahitian specimens collected by Jules Dumont d'Urville in 1824. Hence the scientific name of Gardenia taitensis, and the English name of Tahitian gardenia or Tiaré flower. It was first collected in Tahiti, by the Forsters on Captain Cook's first Pacific voyage (1768–1771), although it was misidentified as Gardenia jasminoides.

The plant originates from Melanesia and Western Polynesia. It is an aboriginal introduction to the Cook Islands and French Polynesia and possibly Hawai’i.

== Common uses ==
=== Monoï oil ===
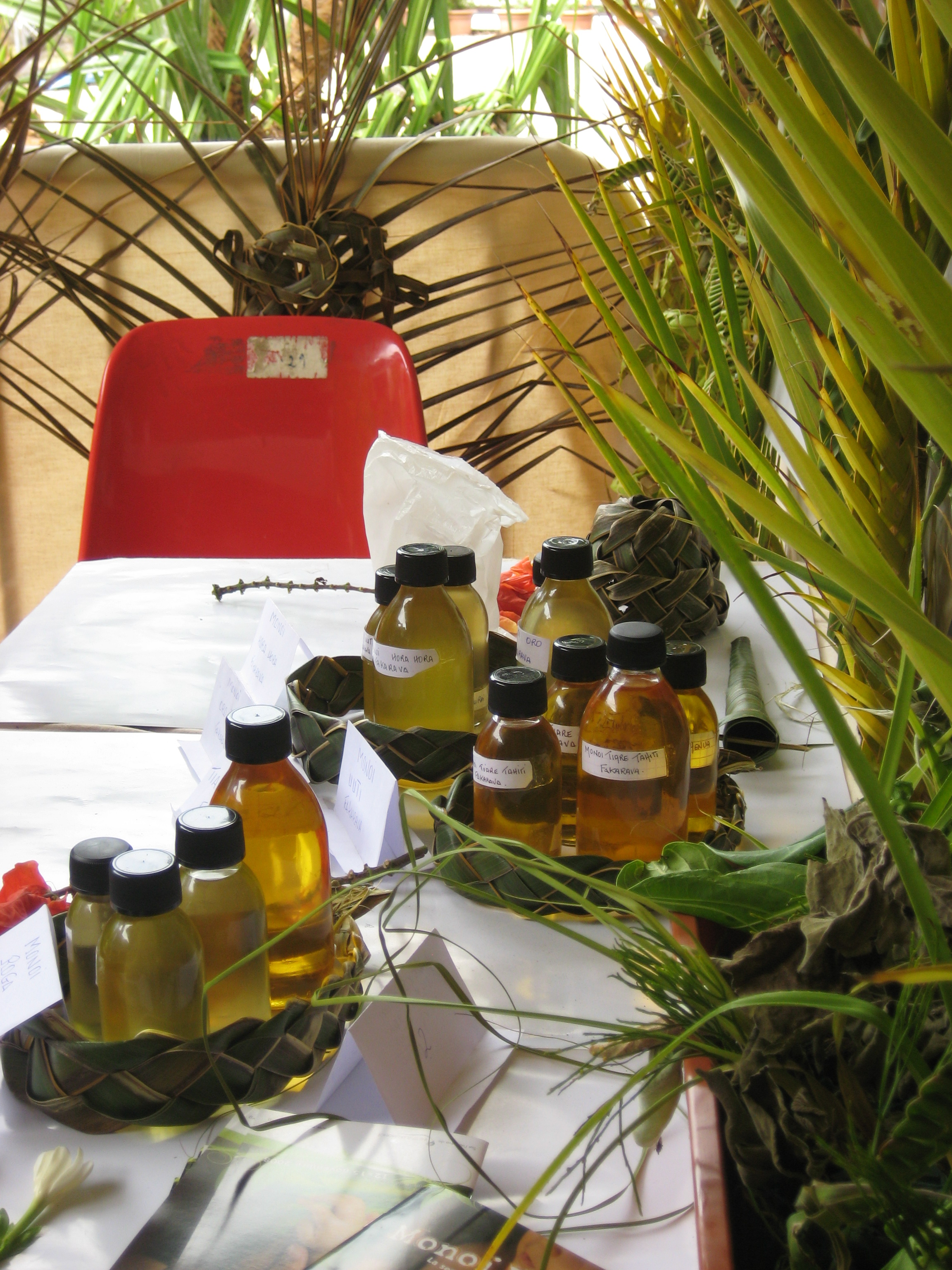
The flower is used to make Monoï oil

This oil is used mainly for cosmetic purposes as a hair or skin treatment. In order to obtain the monoï oil (monoï, pronounced moh-noh-ee, means "scented oil" in Tahitian), tiaré flowers are infused in coconut oil. The maceration must last at least ten days and requires at least ten Tiaré flowers per liter of refined oil.

This manufacturing process, common to all producers of "monoï de Tahiti", is a method similar to "enfleurage" (see enfleurage) in perfumery. Tiaré is also used in niche perfumery but its prohibitively high cost excludes use in commercial perfumery. Notable examples include Tiare by Ormonde Jayne launched in 2009, Tiare by Chantecaille and Coucou by Frater. The Tiaré flowers are hand picked and then laid unopened in oil for 15 days to obtain the extract.

=== Flower necklaces ===
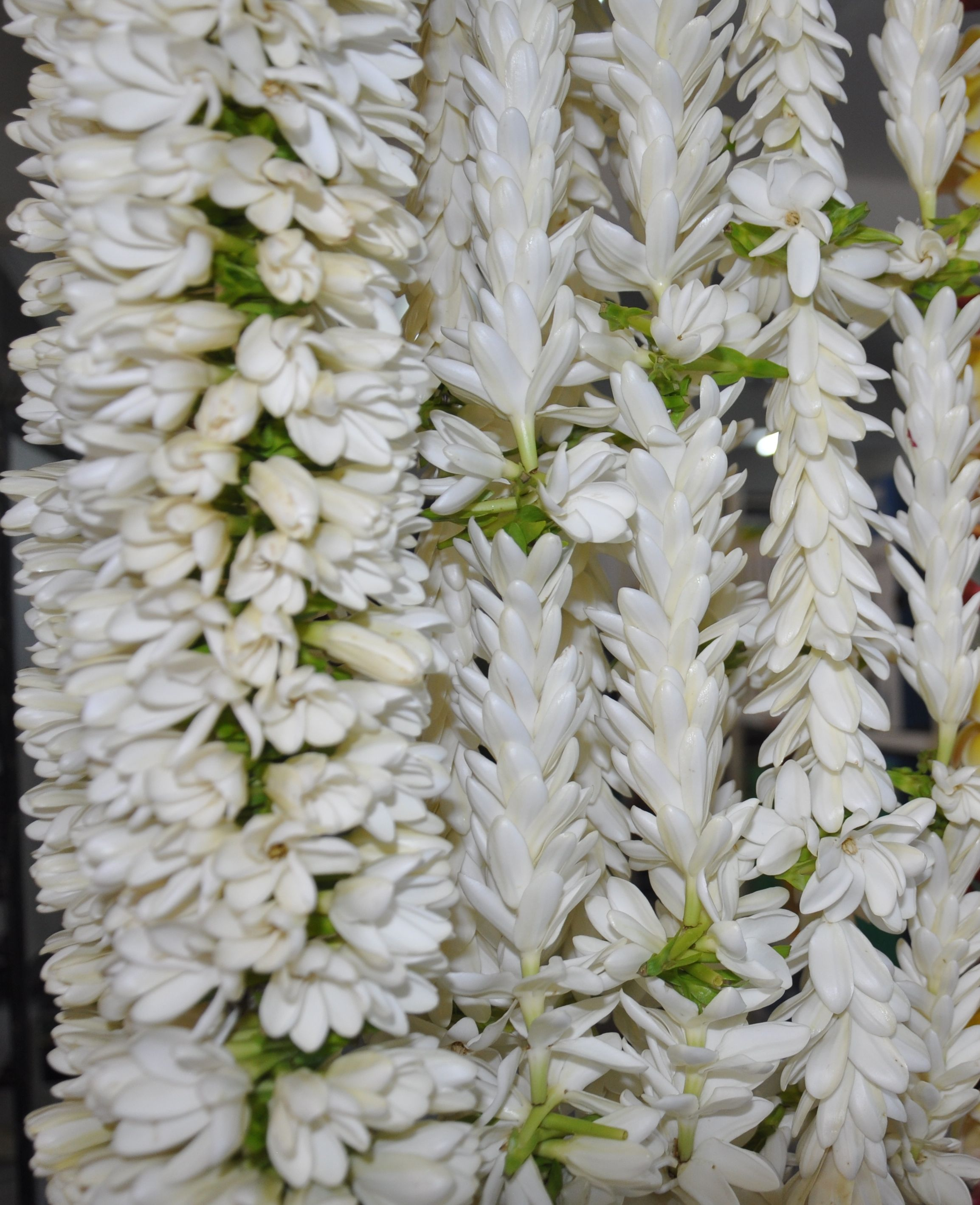
Tiaré necklaces, also called "Ei", "Hei" or "Lei".

Polynesian people in the pacific islands use the extremely fragrant blooms in their flower necklaces, which are called "Ei" in the Cook Islands, "Hei" in Tahiti or "Lei" in Hawaii. In some Pacific island traditions, wearing a flower indicates relationship status. A flower worn on the left ear means the person is taken and on the right ear means available.

=== Herbal medicine ===
The plant is used in traditional herbalism. For example, in Tonga a bark infusion is dripped into the nose, eyes, and mouth to treat "ghost sickness". In Samoa, parts of the plant are used for inflammation.

== Gallery ==
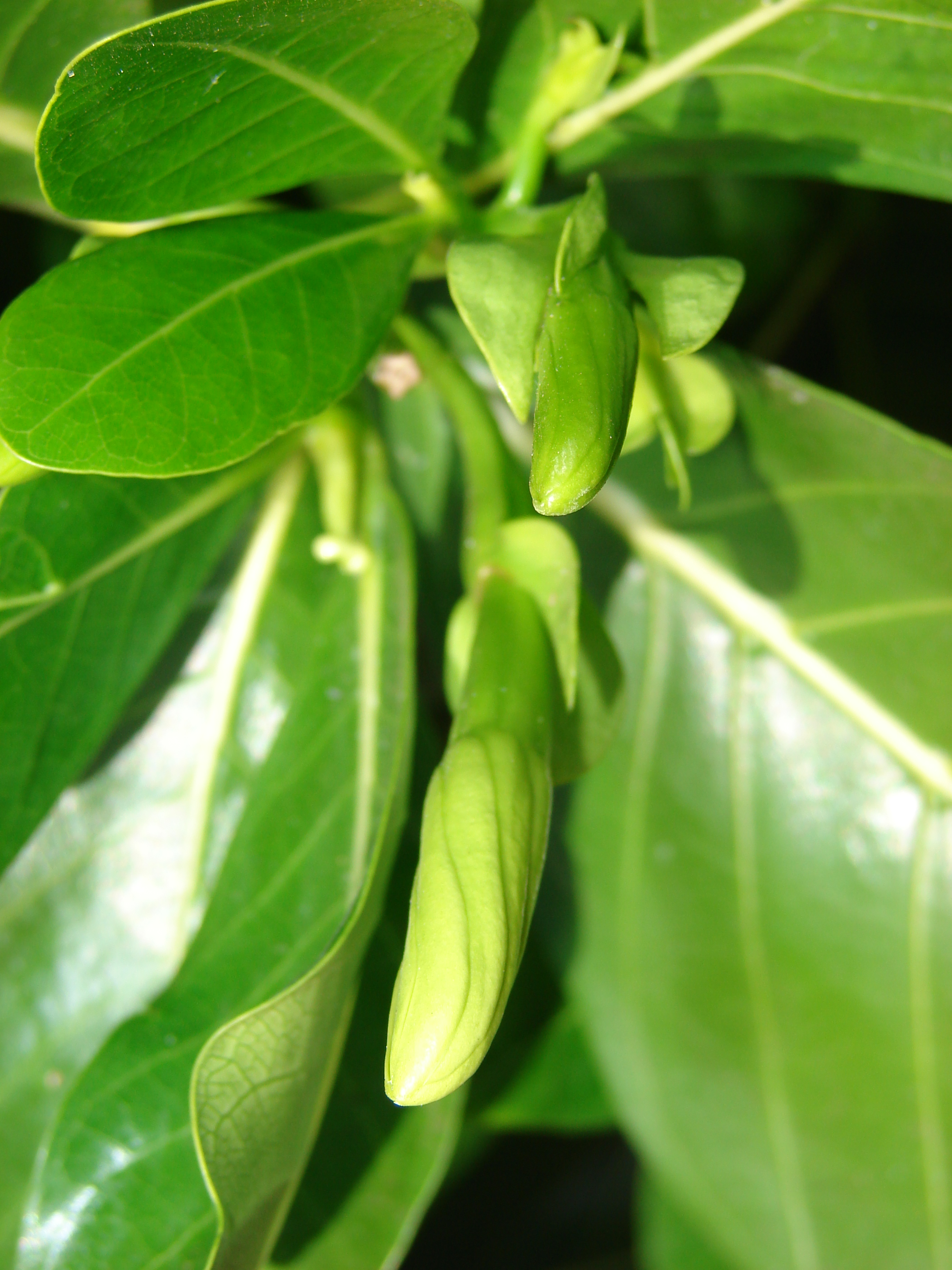
Flower buds

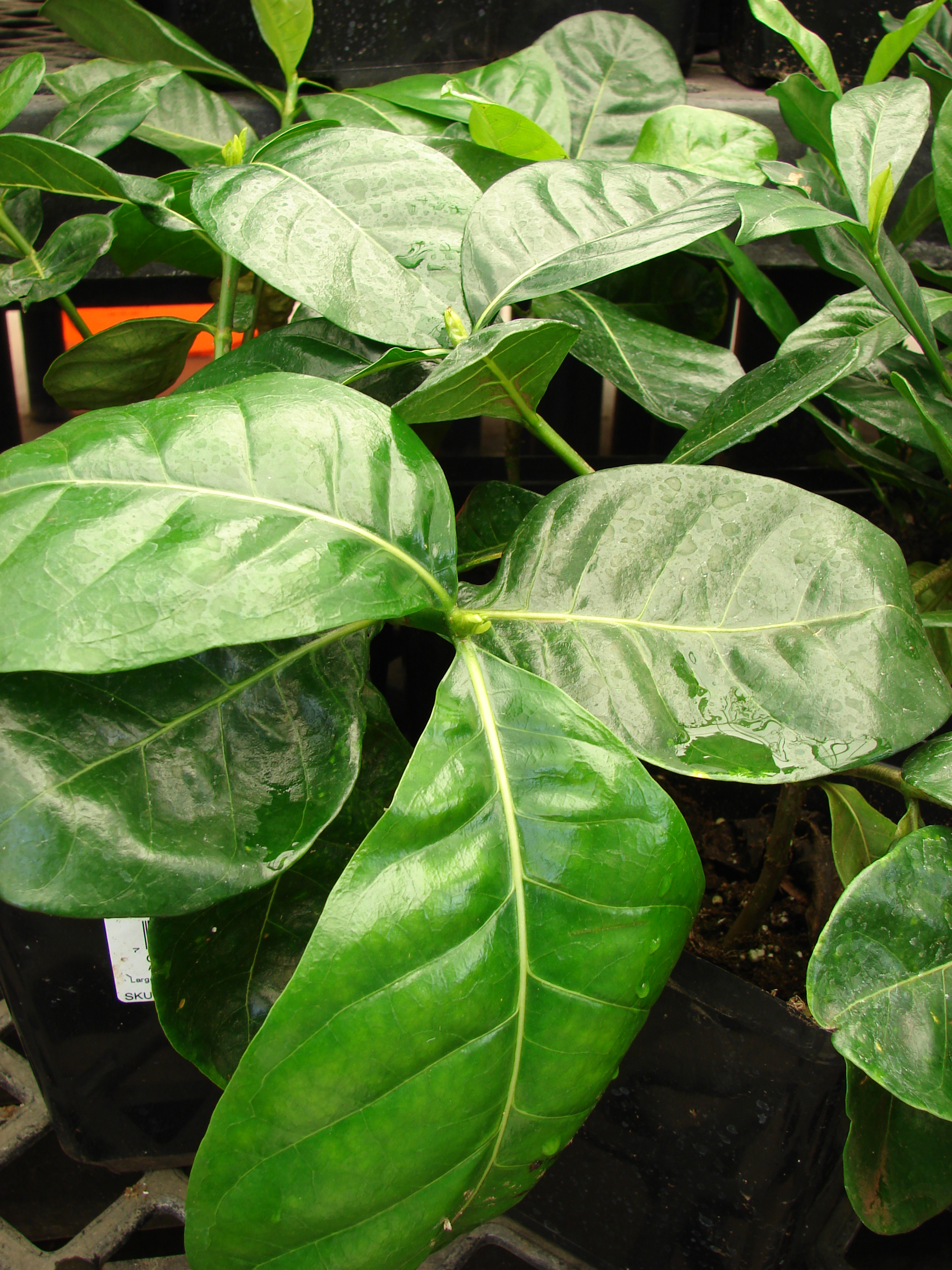
Foliage

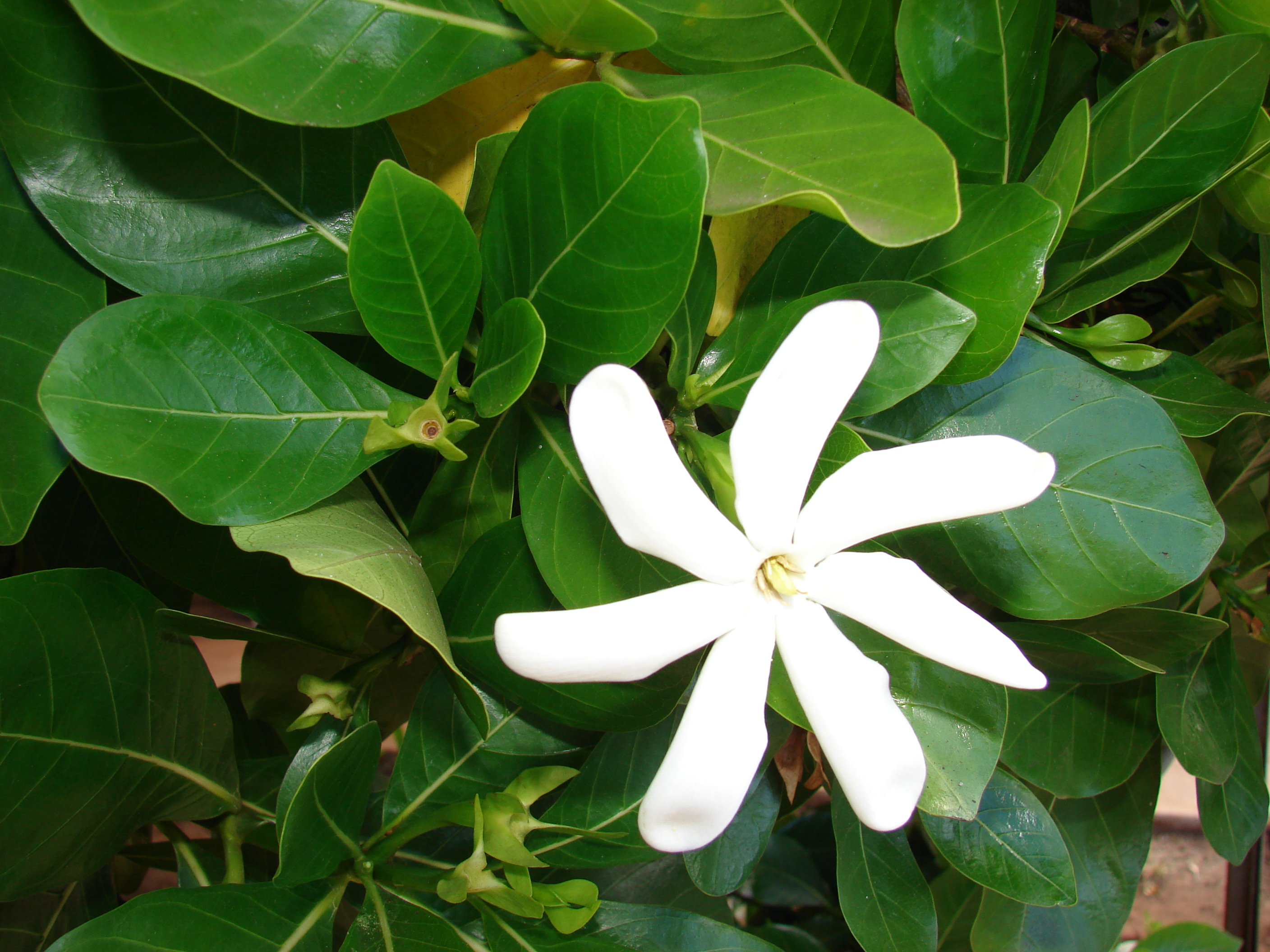
Flower

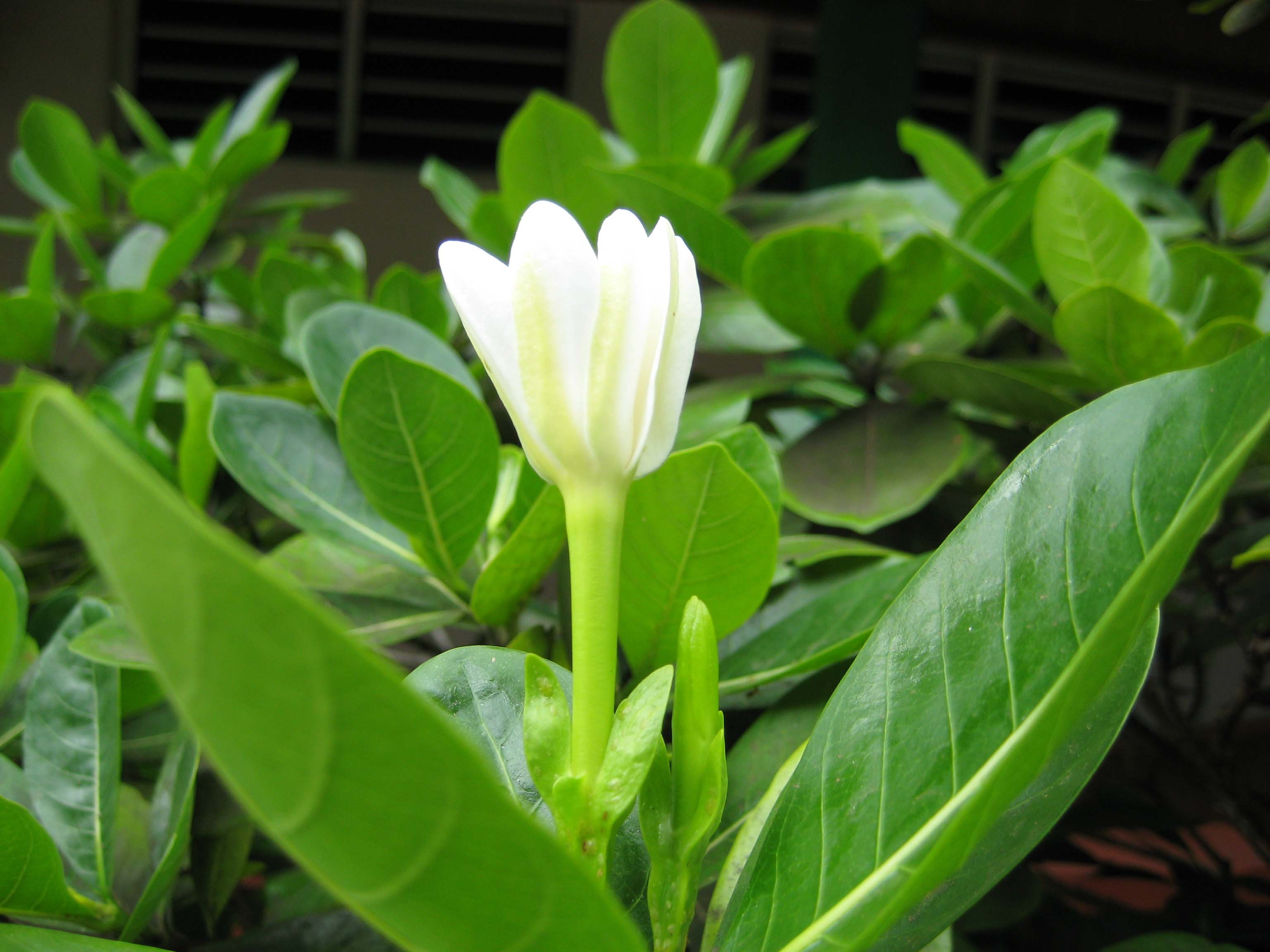
Opening flower

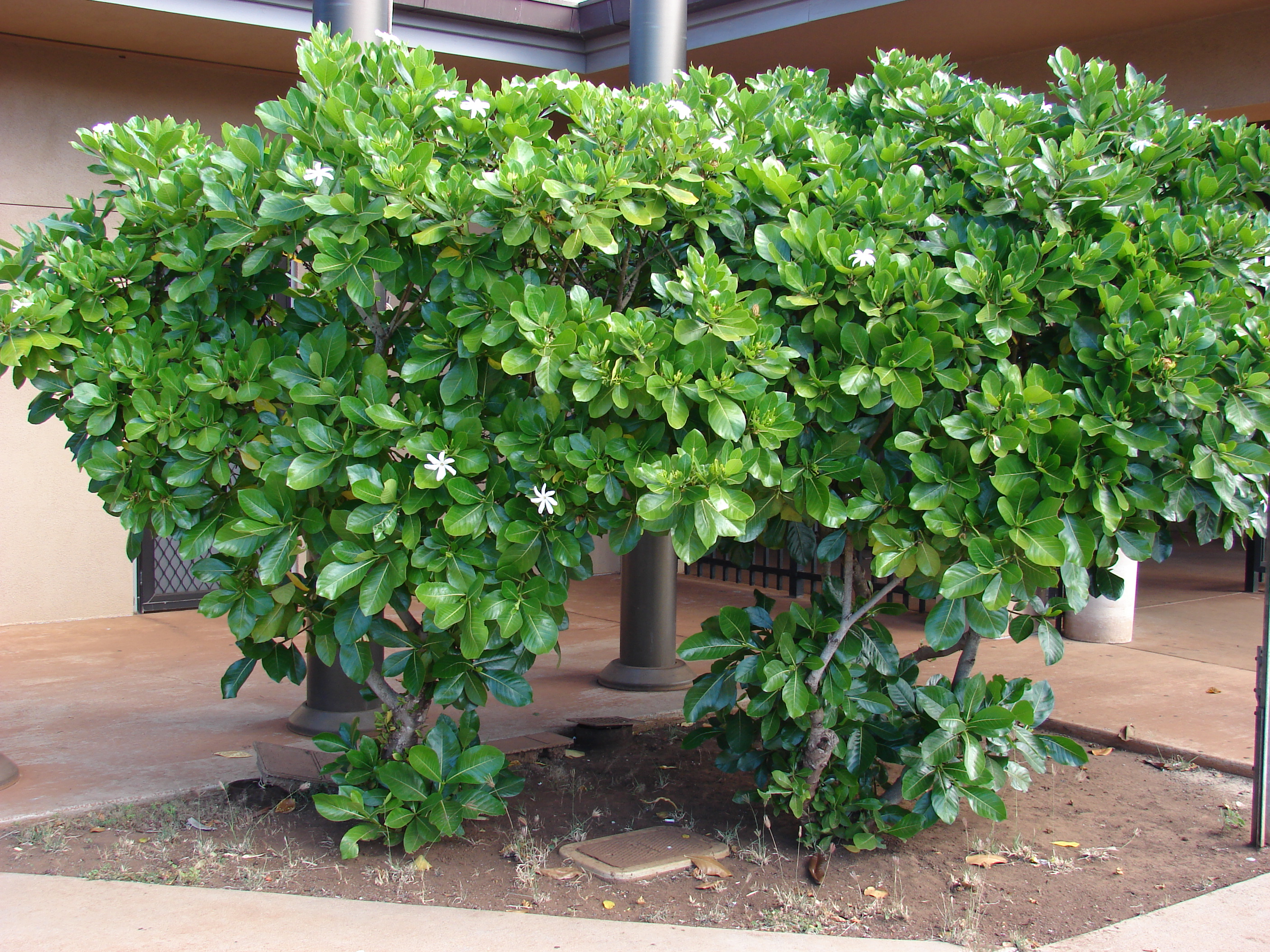
Growth habit
