= Typhistes comatus =

Scientific classification
- Kingdom: Animalia
- Phylum: Arthropoda
- Subphylum: Chelicerata
- Class: Arachnida
- Order: Araneae
- Infraorder: Araneomorphae
- Family: Linyphiidae
- Genus: Typhistes
- Species: T. comatus

Binomial name
- Typhistes comatus Simon, 1894

Species of spider

Typhistes comatus, is a species of spider of the genus Typhistes. It is endemic to Sri Lanka.
