= Holocneminus multiguttatus =

Scientific classification
- Kingdom: Animalia
- Phylum: Arthropoda
- Subphylum: Chelicerata
- Class: Arachnida
- Order: Araneae
- Infraorder: Araneomorphae
- Family: Pholcidae
- Genus: Holocneminus
- Species: H. multiguttatus

Binomial name
- Holocneminus multiguttatus (Simon, 1905)

Synonyms
- Psilochorus multiguttatus Simon, 1905

Species of spider

Holocneminus multiguttatus, is a species of spider of the genus Holocneminus. It is distributed from Sri Lanka to Malaysia and Sulawesi.

== See also ==
- List of Pholcidae species
