= Monoï oil =

Polynesian scented oil

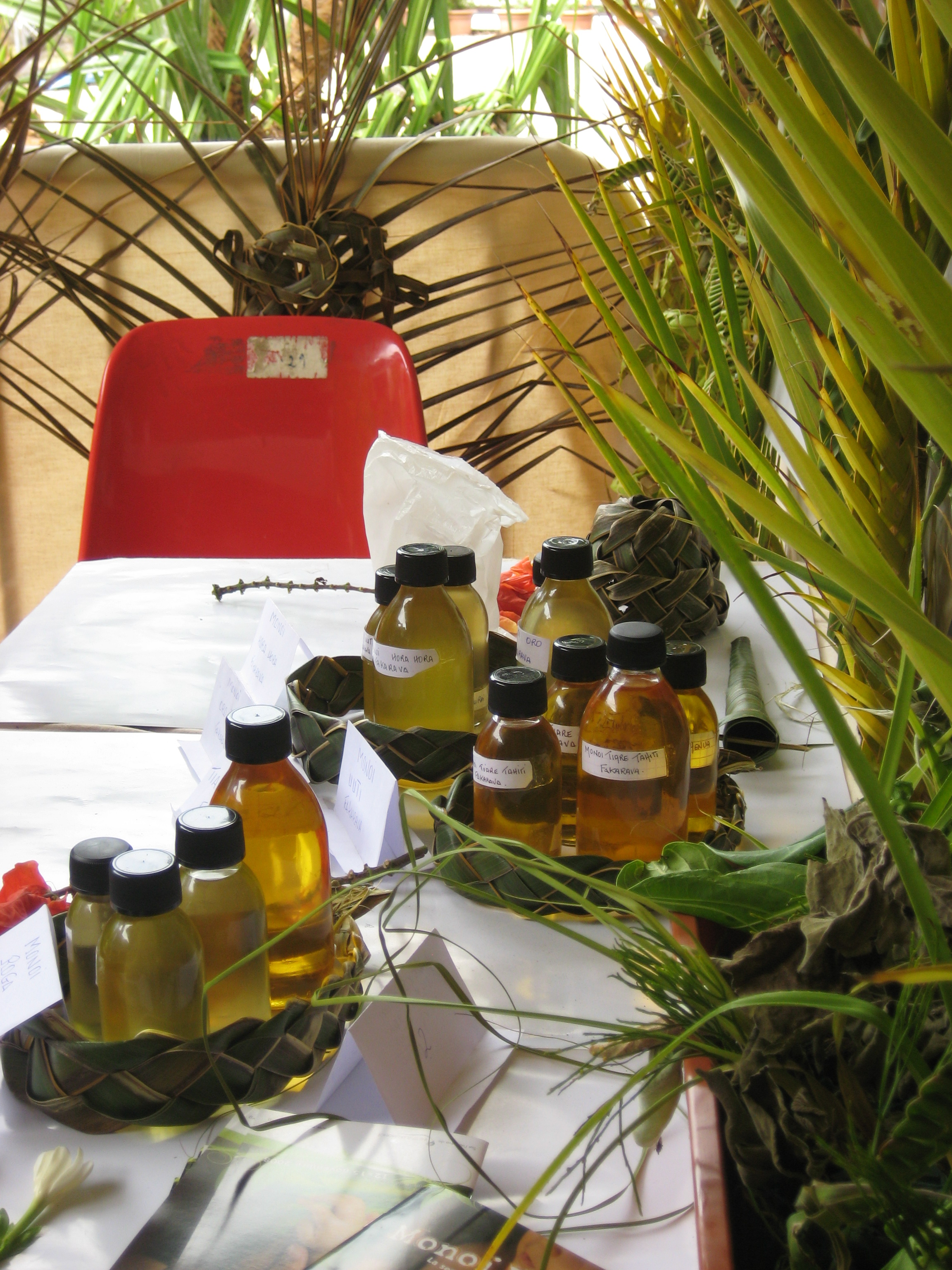
The Monoï Tiaré Tahiti is a perfume-oil made by infusing the blossoms of Tiaré flowers in coconut oil.

Monoï oil is an infused perfume-oil made from soaking the petals of Tahitian gardenias (best known as Tiaré flowers) in coconut oil. Monoï (pronounced mah-noy) is a Tahitian word meaning "scented oil". Monoï is widely used among French Polynesians as a skin and hair softener.

Authentic Tahitian monoï oil follows a strict manufacturing code that oversees the entire process from handpicking the tiaré flowers to storage and shipping of the final product. This process has been validated and protected by an Appellation of Origin which was awarded to Monoï de Tahiti on 1 April 1992.

== History ==
The date when monoï was first created is unknown; however, its origins can be traced back 2000 years to the Maohi people, the indigenous Polynesians. Early European explorers who travelled to the Polynesian islands, including James Cook, documented the natives’ use of monoï for medicinal, cosmetic and religious purposes. Monoï featured prominently in the lives of these ancient people, from birth until death. It was applied to the bodies of newborns to keep them from dehydrating in hot weather, and from getting chilled in cooler temperatures. When a person died, their body was embalmed and perfumed with manoi to help facilitate their journey into the afterlife.

Monoï was also used in ancient Polynesian religious rites. During ceremonies which took place in their temples (marae), priests (tahuʻa) used monoï to anoint sacred objects and purify offerings to their deities.

Māori navigators used monoï to protect their bodies from cold, harsh winds and salt water during long canoe expeditions at sea – even today, many divers rub monoï all over their bodies prior to diving for the same purpose.

In 1942, monoï began to be manufactured commercially.

== Ingredients ==
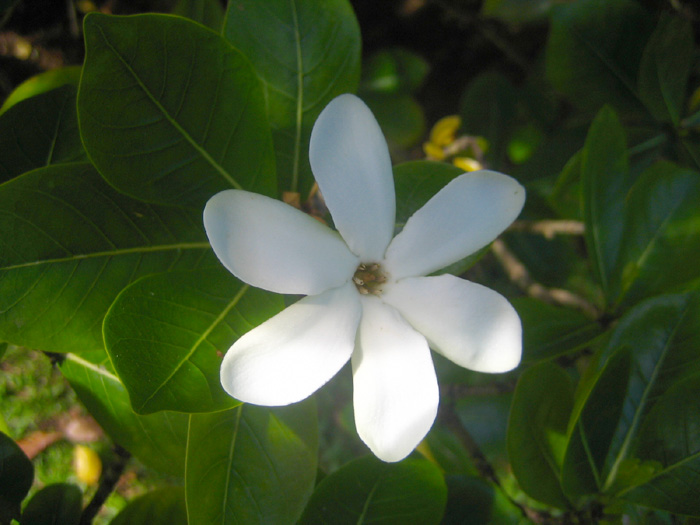
The Tiaré flower.

=== Tiaré flower ===
The tiaré flower (Gardenia taitensis), from the family Rubiaceae, is Tahiti's national flower. The small white, star-shaped flower grows on 3-foot (0.91 m) high bushes throughout French Polynesia, which features soil of coral origin, and blossoms all year long. Other names for this flower include Tiaré Tahiti and Tiaré Maohi.

Beyond their contribution to Monoï Tiaré Tahiti, tiaré flowers are deeply rooted in everyday Polynesian life. In traditional medicine, the flower is prepared in a variety of concoctions to alleviate a range of common maladies including the common cold, headaches and sunburn. Many Polynesians enjoy placing a few tiaré flowers on a small, water-filled saucer to release the fragrance throughout their "fares" (Polynesian houses). The flower necklaces that are offered to tourists as a welcome gesture are created with tiaré flowers, and vahine (Polynesian women) customarily wear them behind one ear.

The tiaré flowers that are used in Monoï de Tahiti are hand-picked at a very particular stage of their growth, specifically when they are still unopened. The flowers are immediately taken to the manufacturing plant and stripped of their pistils. The flower portion is placed in refined coconut oil for a minimum of 15 days. This is known as "enfleurage" (flower soaking), a French term used to designate a specific extraction step. According to specific maceration standards set by the decree of Appellation d'Origine, which each manufacturer must scrupulously follow, a minimum of 15 tiaré flowers must be used in every liter of refined coconut oil.

=== Coconut oil ===
Coconut palm trees remain the most utilized Polynesian island tree and cover approximately 150,000 acres (610 km^{2}) of land. Under favourable conditions, the coconut palm tree grows its first fruits during its 6th year and produces approximately 60 coconuts per year, from its 10th to its 70th year. As the nut begins to form it is completely empty and contains no nutrients. When its size increases, the shell hardens and becomes filled with a transparent liquid that will turn into oil upon full maturity.

When the coconuts fall from the trees, they are gathered to undergo the ancient process of extracting the coconut kernels. The husk is cracked open with an ax. The two coconut halves are left for several hours in the sun, until the almonds have shrunk enough to be removed and broken into small pieces. The fragments are then taken to special flat wooden barracks covered with sliding metal roofs which are popularly known on the Polynesian islands as "coprah dryers". The sliding roofs are only used at night and during the rainy season. The coprah is left to dry for more than a week until the coconut meat has lost over 90% of its moisture.

Placed into special natural fiber bags, the coconut fragments are shipped to the unique oil mill located on the island of Tahiti where they will be thrown into special machines and ground to a fine coco flour. The flour is then heated up to 125 degrees and finally pressed into raw coconut oil. After that step, the oil will undergo more refining to remove all impurities and obtain the highest possible quality.

=== Infusion ===
Once the refining process is completed the coconut oil is placed into special storage tanks until it is purchased by one of only a handful of Monoï manufacturers. These manufacturers will proceed individually to the final maceration step which is to infuse the oil with Tiaré flowers. Monoï de Tahiti must be stored in drums with a food-suitable liner or material. Drums must be lead-sealed when they leave Tahiti and kept away from humidity, light and heat. Previously, these infused oils were stored in dried shells of wax gourd fruit.

== Common uses ==
Recent manufacturer tests verify that monoï oil is rich in methyl salicylate which is a skin-soothing agent. It is a naturally concentrated emollient which penetrates the skin, re-hydrates the layers of the epidermis and shields skin against external damages including sun and wind.

Monoï oil is used:

- After a shower or bath to rehydrate skin.
- Before or after a swim, it provides protection against the effects of sun, wind, sea or pool water
- As a pre-shampoo hot oil treatment, it helps repair and deep condition the hair to a healthy shine.
- As a hair treatment after shampooing, once hair is dry. It adds shine, smooths frizz, and conditions the hair.
- During a bath. A few drops in the water reportedly encourages relaxation while keeping skin soft and subtly fragrant.
- As a dark tanning oil
- After being warmed in the palms of the hands, it is suited for massaging sore parts of the body or for warming up a weak body.
- As a pain reliever for sunburn.
