= Nestor Ohu =

Marquesan politician

Mayor of Ua Huka
- Incumbent
- Assumed office May 2014

Personal details
- Born: March 2, 1962 (age 63) French Polynesia

Nestor Ohu (born 2 March 1962) is a politician of the Marquesas Islands. He is the mayor of the island of Ua Huka, governing over 592 inhabitants. He was elected in May 2014, for a term of six years until 2020.
