= Ua Huka =

Island in French Polynesia

Ua-Huka
- Commune
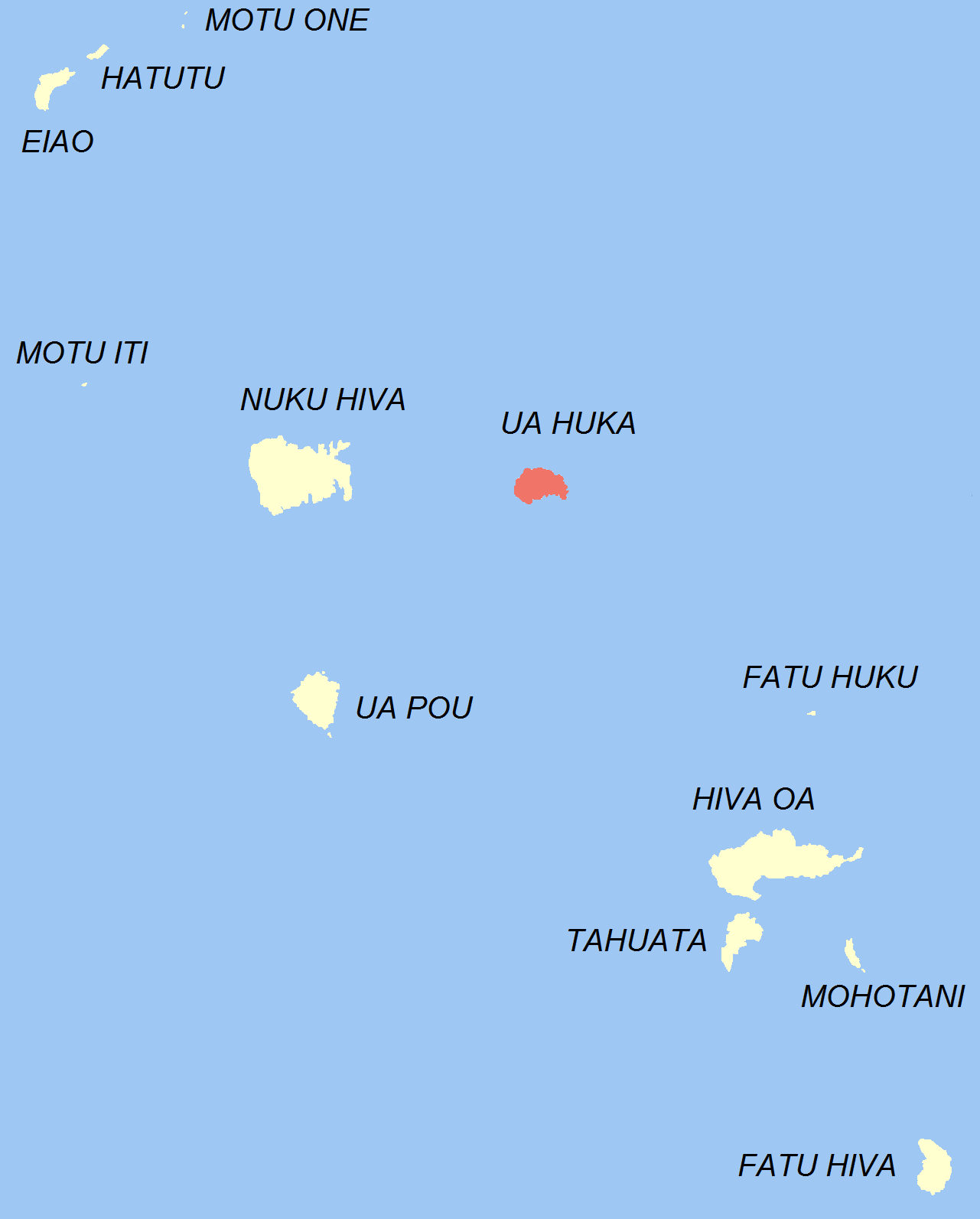
- Location of the commune (in red) within the Marquesas Islands
- Location of Ua-Huka
- Coordinates: 8°54′S 139°33′W
- Country: France
- Overseas collectivity: French Polynesia
- Subdivision: Marquesas Islands

Government
  - Mayor (2020–2026): Nestor Ohu
- Area^{1}: 83.4 km^{2} (32.2 sq mi)
- Highest elevation: 857 m (2,812 ft)
- Lowest elevation: 0 m (0 ft)
- Population (2022): 719
  - Density: 8.62/km^{2} (22.3/sq mi)
- Time zone: UTC−09:30
- INSEE/Postal code: 98756 /98744
- ^{1} French Land Register data, which excludes lakes, ponds, glaciers > 1 km^{2} (0.386 sq mi or 247 acres) and river estuaries.

Ua Huka is one of the Marquesas Islands, in French Polynesia, an overseas territory of France in the Pacific Ocean. It is situated in the northern group of the archipelago, approximately 40 km (25 mi) to the east of Nuku Hiva, at 8°54′S 139°33′W. The island is known as the "horse island" for its large population of feral horses.

== Name ==
Ua Huka in Marquesan means "two holes"; it is sometimes also found spelled Roohka or Ua Huna. The first Western navigator to sight the island was U.S. Navy Captain Joseph Ingraham in 1791. He named the island "Washington Island" in honor of U.S. President George Washington, a name which was eventually extended to include all of the northern group of the Marquesas Islands. Other names for the island include Riou and Solide. See also Names of the Marquesas Islands.

The spider genus Uahuka is named after this island.

== History ==
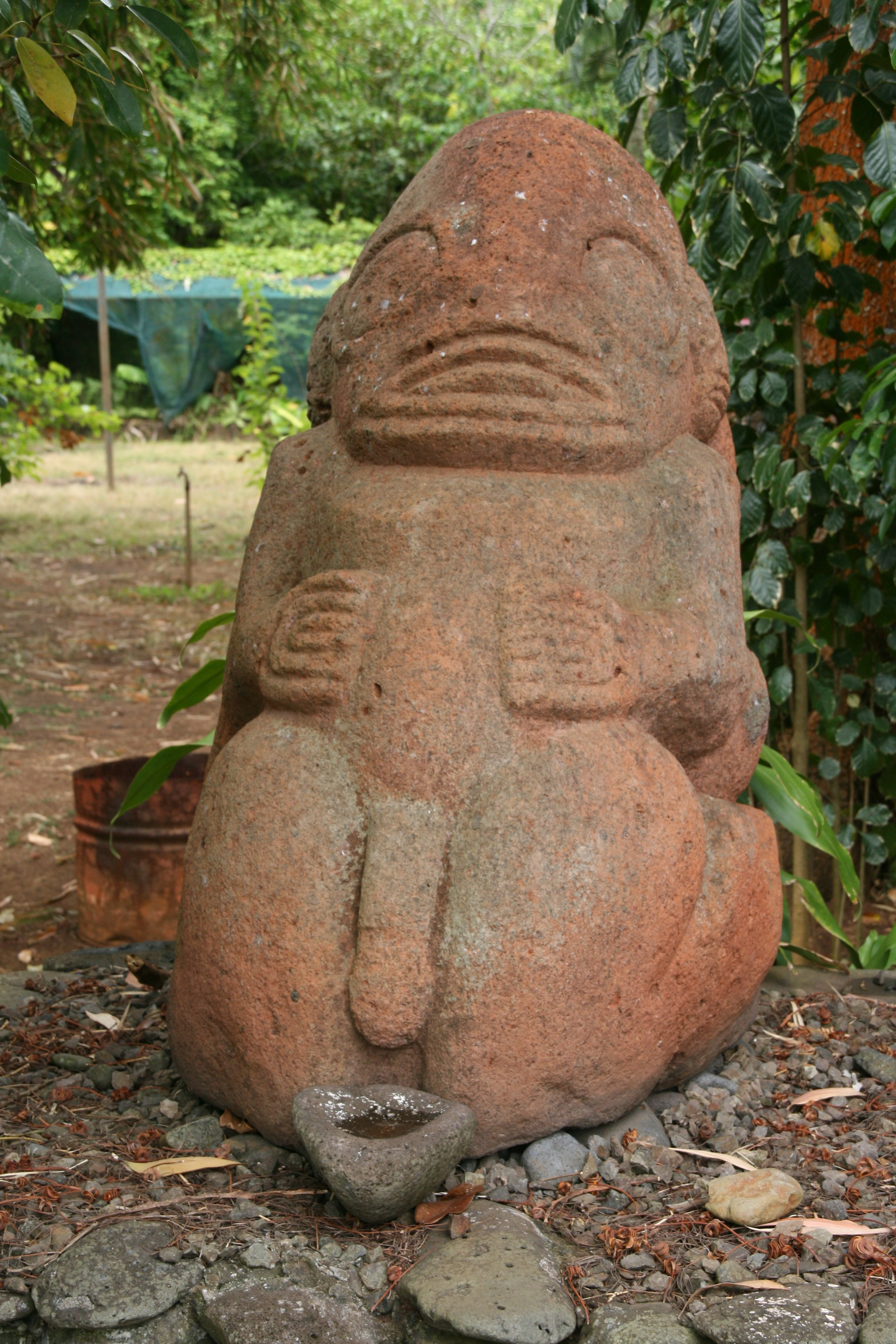
Modern male tiki, located at the entry of the Papuakeikaha arboretum, island of Ua Huka

Although Ua Huka is located in the northern Marquesas, historically, culturally and linguistically the island's tribes were far more closely aligned with the southern Marquesas Islands, especially with the tribes from Pepane, in the eastern half of Hiva Oa.

Ua Huka was settled by Polynesians about 1700 years ago. The first settlers lived in settlements near the beach. In 1998, at Hane, a French archaeological team explored remains of settlements buried by a dune. It is the oldest settlement in the Marquesas so far, dating to 350 AD. Five researchers found seventeen human skeletons, fishhooks, a harpoon point, net weights and scrapers. From the detritus of the settlement, it appears that the indigenous people fed mainly on fish, birds (skeletons of a dozen extinct bird species have been found) and shellfish.

As in other islands of the Marquesas, as population density increased, people settled in the upper reaches of the valleys and, favored by the enclosed location, a strictly stratified tribal society developed. From the places of worship in the valleys, it can be seen that there must have been at least five independent tribes, possibly more.

Archaeological remains of cult and residential platforms are still visible in the Vaipaee, Hanei, Hokatu, Hinaehi and Hane valleys.

American merchant captain Joseph Ingraham, who sailed on the brig Hope from Boston around Cape Horn to China, discovered Ua Huka on April 19, 1791, and named it "Washington Island" in honor of U.S. President George Washington.

Another early 18th-century visitor was the Frenchman Étienne Marchand. He sailed from Marseille on December 14, 1790, on the newly built merchant ship Solide, rounded Cape Horn and arrived at the Marquesas in June 1791. He named Ua Huka "Île du Solide" in honor of his ship.

Lieutenant Richard Hergest, commander of the Daedalus, the supply ship of the Vancouver expedition, arrived at Ua Huka on March 30, 1792, and christened it "Riou Island".

On June 2, 1842, French Rear Admiral Abel Aubert Dupetit-Thouars took possession of the northern group of the Marquesas for France. Ua Huka became a French colony.

== Geography ==
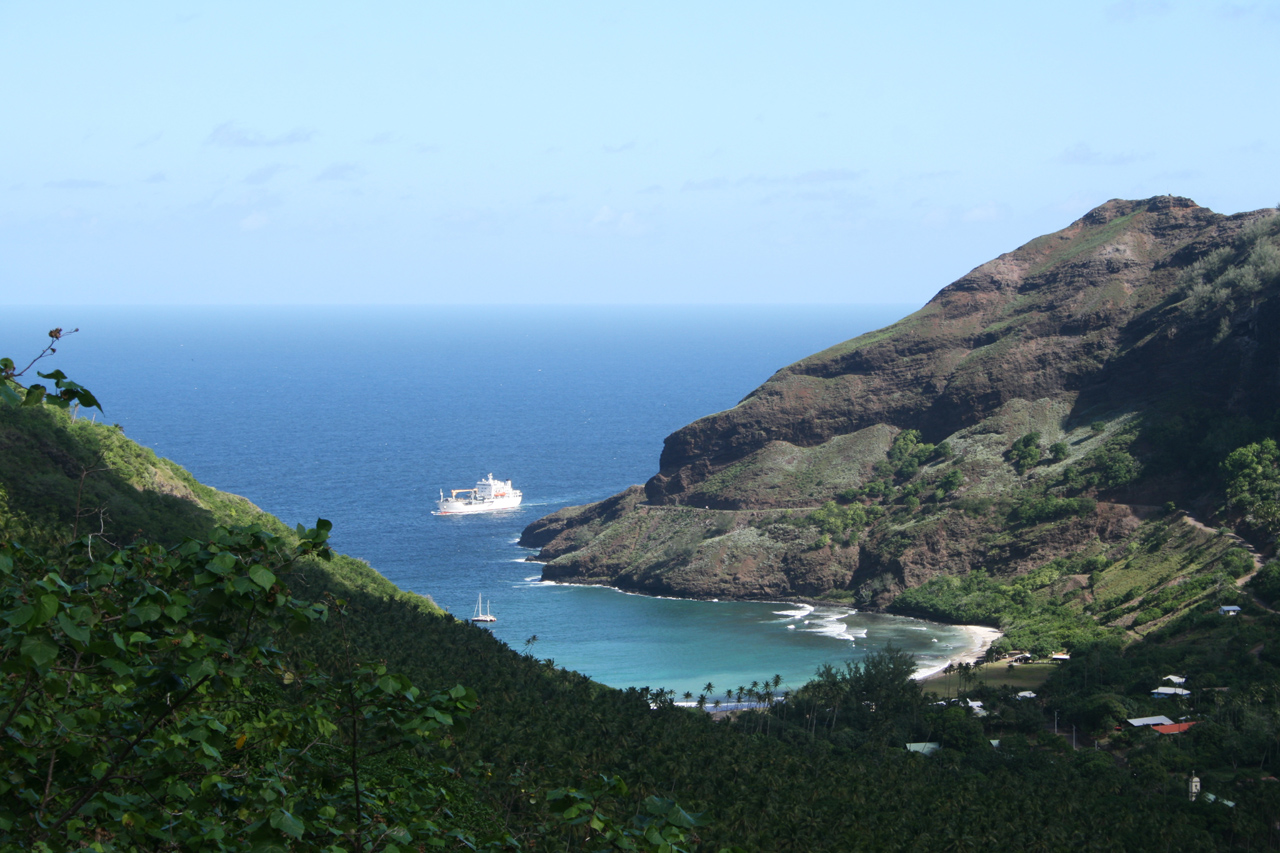
Hane Bay

The island is shaped approximately like a crescent, with its concave edge facing the south. The land area is approximately 83 km^{2} (32 sq. mi.). The center of the island is a high plateau, deeply indented in places by narrow river valleys. The highest peak, Hitikau reaches an elevation of 884 metres (2,900 ft).

Ua Huka is a shield volcano that was emplaced between 2.2 and 2.4 million years ago. It is thought to have formed by a center of upwelling magma called the Marquesas hotspot. The island is served by Ua Huka Airport.

In contrast to the lush, larger islands of the Marquesas, Ua Huka gives a rather arid and forbidding impression, the vegetation is sparse. The rugged peaks are not as high as those of the other islands of the archipelago, about 600 m in the west and up to 800 m in the east. The highest elevation is Mount Hitikau, at 857 metres. The lower overall altitude means less cloud rainfall. Ua Huka has a much drier climate than the neighboring islands. A large part of the island is made up of extensive, arid plateaus and deep, fertile valleys in which settlements are also found.

The coast, very rugged, is not protected by a coral reef, so the strong waves come directly to the shores. There are several rocky islets (motus) off the main island. Motu Hane is especially spectacular. It is a 163-meter-high, sugarloaf-shaped rock cone off Hane Bay on the south coast. The island is 410 meters long in a north–south direction and up to 210 meters wide, and lies 250 metres south of the Tekaepa headland, which separates the Hane and Hokatu valleys.

=== Geology ===
Ua Huka is formed by the northern half of two interlocking volcanoes.

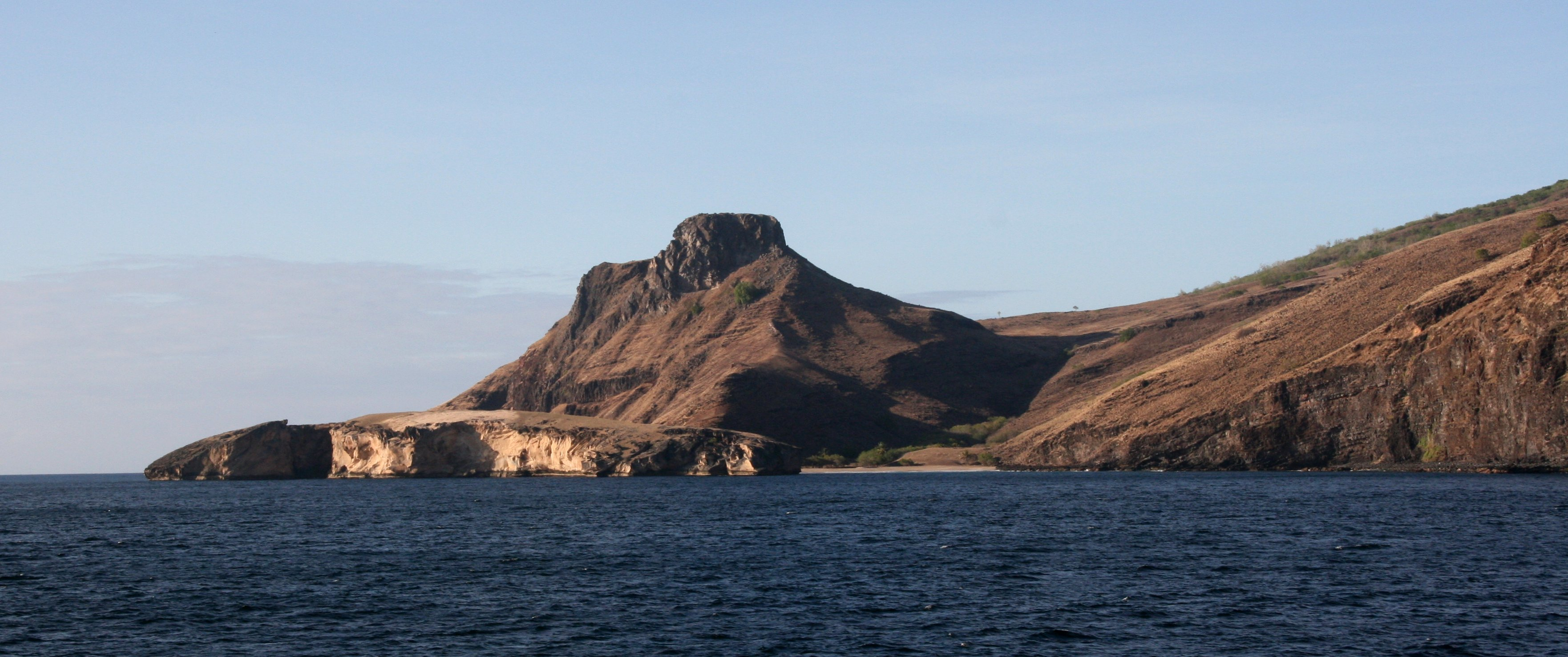
The Matau point, with semi-arid climate, on the south-western coast of the island of Ua Huka

The first caldera, about 10 km in diameter, contains the Vaipaee valley. The second caldera, included in the eastern half of the first, reaches 857 metres at Mount Hitikau, the highest point on the island. Its diameter is about 5 km and its age is estimated to be between 2.9 and 2.8 million years old. It contains the Hane and Hokatu valleys.

The island then underwent another volcanic period in the southwest (Tepeopo scoriaceous volcano and Tahoatikihau Hawaiian volcano) dated around 1.6 - 1.4 Ma. This shows a long geological activity compared to the other islands, at least 1.5 Ma.

Tahoatikihau crater contains a fossil lava lake. At the western end of the island there are several sea caves.

=== Flora ===
The vegetation of the plateaus of Ua Huka is poorer than that of the other Marquesan islands, especially the northwestern part of the island, corresponding to the outer side of the large crater. Much of the plant cover, here consists primarily of dryland scrub due to a drier climate.

Unlike the plateaus and hills, the valleys have a much more exuberant vegetation, similar to that of the other islands of the archipelago. This diversity has been enhanced by the creation of the Papuakeikaa arboretum near Vaipaee. This unique achievement in Polynesia brings together more than a thousand species of trees from all over the world, including one of the largest collections of citrus trees in the world (almost three hundred varieties). It is intended to serve as a reserve for the reforestation of the island.

The impoverishment of the vegetation is largely due to domestic animals introduced by man, which have then been reintroduced into the wild. Goats, pigs and horses have largely destroyed the vegetation. Ua Huka proudly calls itself the "Island of Horses", but the serious damage they have caused is hidden.

In the valleys there are small remnants of the original rainforest, consisting of Hibiscus tiliaceus, Piper latifolium, Pterophylla marquesana, and Metrosideros. In the humid and shady areas of the narrow gorges grow lush masses of moss and ferns. In the west of the island, the rainforest changes to a drier forest, composed mainly of hibiscus, pandanus, guavas and glochidion. In the lower areas of the large valleys, coconut and breadfruit trees have been planted. There is still a remnant of Pisonia grandis in the lower reaches of Hane Bay.

The short valleys of the north coast are almost devoid of vegetation, and the upper parts of the mountains are even arid and desert-like.

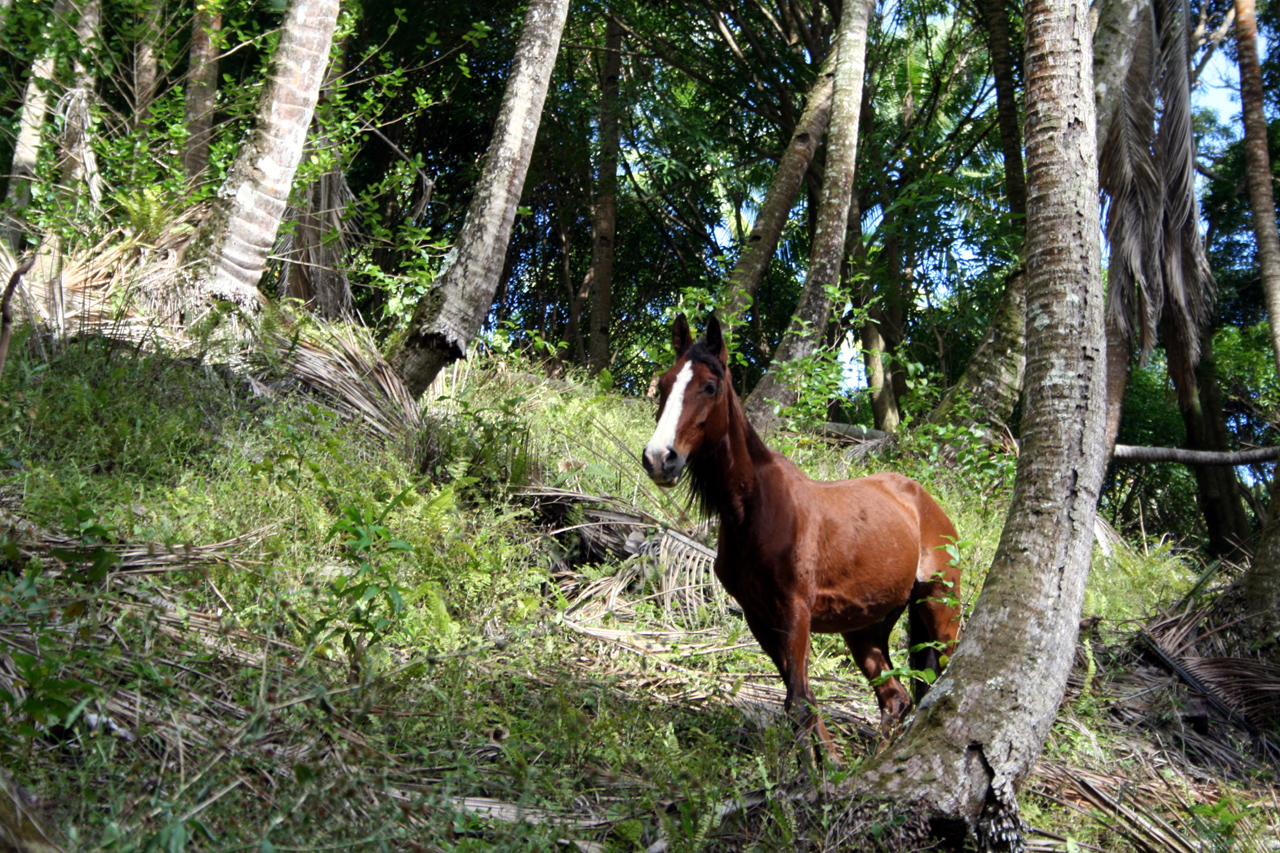
Horse at Ua Huka

=== Fauna ===
Because of the sparse vegetation, there are only a few species of native land animals on Ua Huka, mainly insects, lizards, land birds and spiders including a genus of spiders endemic to the Marquesas named after this island itself belonging to the canopy spider family (Linyphiidae). The large number of feral goats and horses that graze freely there contribute to scrub deforestation. Horses were brought from Chile to Ua Huka by Admiral du Petit-Thouars in 1842, it has gained a reputation ever since as the "horse island" where it is said that there are more horses than people on the island numbering around 3,000.

Life is richer around the island: giant tortoises in Haavei Bay, sharks, dolphins, manta rays and thousands of seabirds live on the islets. In particular, Hemeni and Teuaua, also known as the "bird islands", are home to a large colony of terns. The Polynesian Ornithological Society "MANU" lists 35 species of birds on Ua Huka, 16 marine and 17 terrestrial, 8 of which are endemic.

Its forests also contain the last specimens of the Iphis monarch, a small passerine bird.

There are six endemic and critically endangered landbird species in Ua Huka:

- Iphis monarch (Pomarea iphis)
- Marquesas warbler (Acrocephalus mendanae)
- Marquesas salangana (Callocalia ocista)
- Marquesas pigeon (Ducula galeata)
- Ultramarine lorikeet pihiti (Vini ultramarina)
- White-headed fruit pigeon (Ptilinopus dupetithouarsii)

== Administration ==
Administratively Ua Huka forms the commune (municipality) of Ua-Huka, part of the administrative subdivision of the Marquesas Islands. This commune consists solely of the island of Ua Huka itself.

The administrative centre of the commune is the settlement of Hane.

== Demography ==
The people of Ua Huka live on the south coast in the villages of Vaipae'e, Hane and Hokatu. These three villages are part of the commune of Ua Huka. The island had 584 inhabitants in the 2002 census, a number that increased to 719 inhabitants according to 2022 figures, 13 living mainly in the villages of Vaipae and Hane.

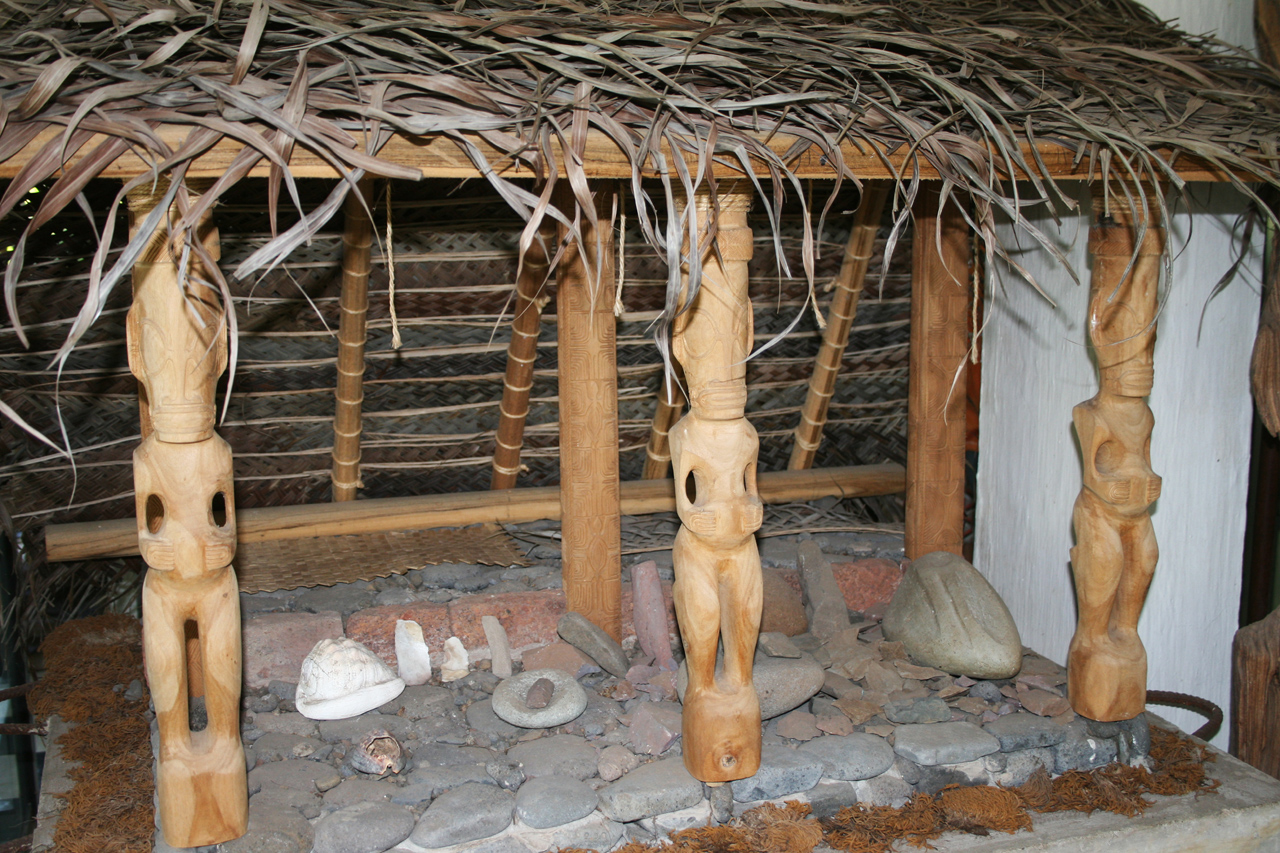
Reconstruction of a Marquesan house on Ua Huka

Population growth is one of the lowest in the Marquesas, mainly due to emigration. As there is no secondary school on the island, young people are forced to leave at a very young age, first to Nuku Hiva and then to Pape'ete for higher education. Many do not return to Ua Huka afterwards.

Historical population
| Year | Pop. | ±% |
|---|---|---|
| 2002 | 582 | — |
| 2007 | 570 | −2.1% |
| 2012 | 621 | +8.9% |
| 2017 | 678 | +9.2% |
| 2022 | 719 | +6.0% |

=== Languages ===
The languages spoken on Ua Huka are mainly French (the only official language) and Marquesan, with one peculiarity: the dialect spoken here contains elements of the northern and southern Marquesan languages (to a lesser extent). The southern elements are very close to a dialect spoken by the inhabitants of the island of Tahuata, which shows that there were frequent exchanges between the two islands before the arrival of Westerners.

Tahitian is spoken by a minority.

=== Religion ===
The majority of the population, like the other Marquesan Islands, is Christian, as a result of missionary activity by both Catholic and Protestant groups. The Catholic Church controls at least 3 religious buildings on the island which are under the administration of the Roman Catholic Diocese of Taiohae (Dioecesis Taiohaënus seu Humanae Telluris; Diocèse de Taiohae ou Tefenuaenata): The Church of Saint Therese of the Infant Jesus in Hane (Église de Sainte-Thérèse-de-l'Enfant-Jésus), the Church of Christ the King in Hotaku (Église du Christ-Roi) and the Church of the Immaculate Conception in Vaipaee (Église de l'Immaculée Conception).

== Economy ==
Ua Huka's economy revolves around three main areas: agriculture, handicrafts and tourism. The currency is (still) the CFP franc, which is pegged to the euro.

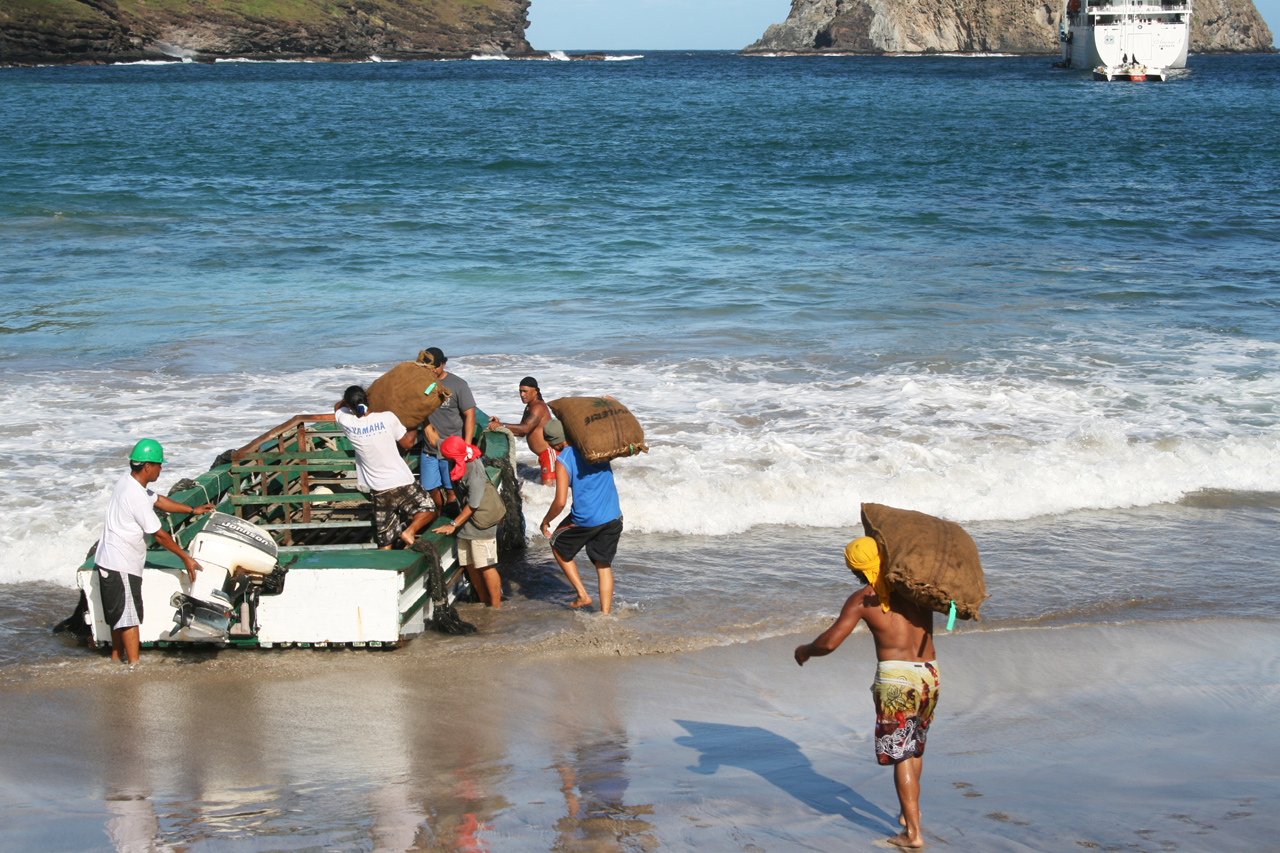
Copra boarding at one of Ua Huka's beaches

Agriculture is based on free-ranging horses and goats, but also on fishing, copra and, more recently, citrus fruits. Hunting wild goats, collecting shells, birds' eggs and fruit complete the diet.

Although the primary economic activity remains the production of copra, Ua Huka has rich resources for tourism, including restorations of various archæological sites, museums displaying the former glory of Marquesan civilization, and the preservation of the island's unique flora. Among the archæological remains at sites such as Tehavea and Meiaute are ancient petroglyphs and thousands of bird bones. The Pupuakeiha Arboretum consists of 17 ha (42 acres) planted with over 300 species of trees. It is hoped that one day this wealth of species will be able to be used to reforest the island. On the western end of the island are found a number of sea-caves.

Crafts consist mainly of wood carving, for which the inhabitants of Ua Huka are renowned, which is rather paradoxical given the small area occupied by trees. Some craftsmen choose to go to other islands to practise their trade more easily. The most commonly carved objects are puzzles, spears, plates and bracelets. The most commonly used species are miro (rosewood), tou (Cordia subcordata), toa (ironwood, for jigsaw puzzles) and sandalwood. Other crafts include stone carving (tikis, mortars), bone carving (forks, hooks), tapa making and the production of monoi oil, jams and other fruit products. Also in this land of horses, craftsmen work with leather, including the saddles that have replaced the old wooden saddles.

=== Tourism ===
Tourism allows locals to sell their handicrafts, especially when the Aranui passes through regularly. Of course, visitors can go horseback riding; it is also possible to tour the island by boat. Tourists can also visit the arboretum and the island's six museums. Some hostels offer boarding accommodation.

The wealth of tourism is based on the restoration of the many archaeological sites, the exhibition of archaeological remains in two museums, and the preservation of the flora in the only Polynesian botanical garden. Among the archaeological remains are ancient petroglyphs. To the west is the mysterious "grotto of the steps". This is a grotto accessible only by sea where there are footprints.

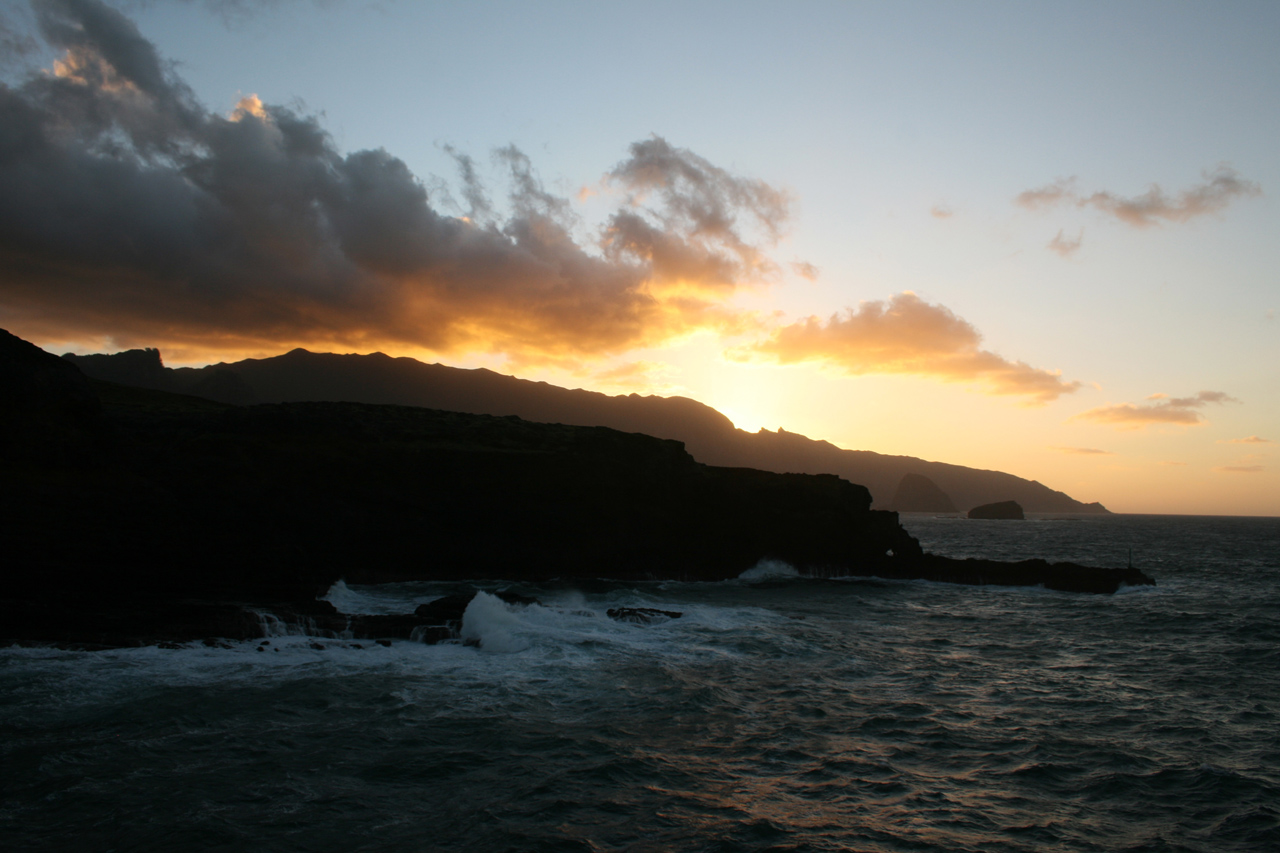
Sunrise on Ua Huka

The most important archaeological site on the island is Meiaute, at the foot of Mount Hitikau on the south coast. It is an extensive complex of stone platforms, only partially exposed, with paepae (living platforms) and mea'e (ceremonial platforms), as well as three red tufa tiki, up to a metre high.

At Vaikivi, in the Vaipae'e valley and only accessible on foot, there are about 50 carved petroglyphs, including faces (masks?), geometric figures and, unique to the Marquesas, a sailing canoe. More petroglyphs can be found in the upper, now uninhabited area of the Hane Valley, as well as numerous remains of residential and ceremonial platforms.

The village of Hokatu, the smallest of the island's three villages, is known for its excellent woodcarvers. There is also a small community museum with an interesting collection of seashells, as well as historical artefacts belonging to the village families.

In Manihina, two kilometres east of the village of Vaipaee, the then mayor Leon Litchlé founded a botanical garden in 1974, the 17-hectare Pupuakeiha Arboretum, where more than 300 species of trees have been planted. It allows visitors to see how the trees have adapted to the Marquesan soil and to select varieties to reforest the island, and preserves many of the species native to the region. Of special interest to visitors are the unique large-leaved Marquesas palms (Pelagodoxa henryana) and the collection of more than 100 species of citrus trees.

The island's most beautiful white beach is at Manihina, also a good place for snorkelling. There are other small black and grey sand beaches in Haavai and Hane Bays.

== Culture ==
The island has several archaeological sites as well as interesting natural sites (the "Invisible Bay" of Vaipaee, the bays of Haavei and Hatuana, the "Cave of Footprints" containing a beach where footprints reappear after each tide, etc.).

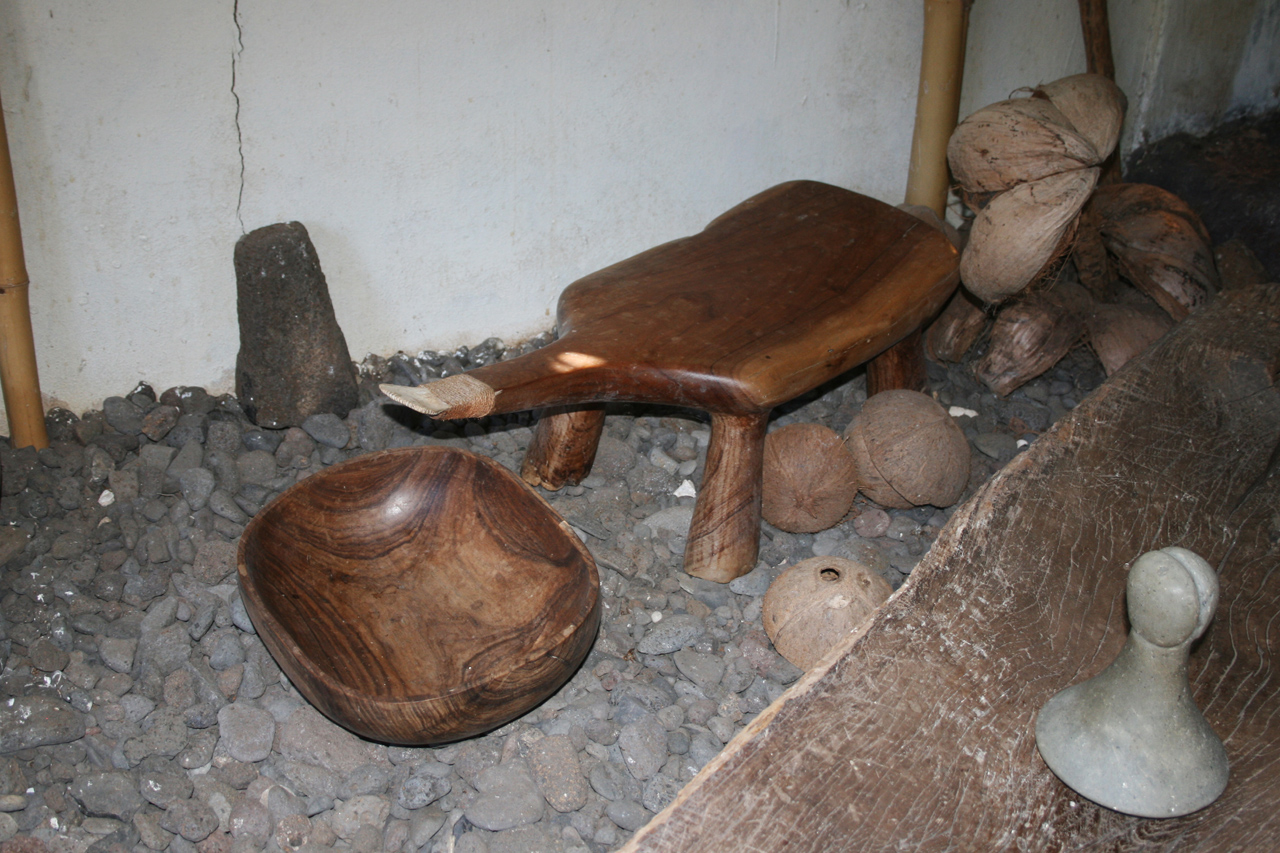
One of the museums on the island

Despite its small population, Ua Huka has no less than six museums, including:

- the Vaipae'e Archaeological Museum: opened in 1989, it contains numerous traditional and handicraft objects, many of them donated by the people themselves (tikis, wood carvings, tapa bark raffia, decorated popoi bowls, bracelets, earrings, shovels, U'u sticks and native stone tools). It also has ethnographic documents, precious testimonies of the Marquesan culture.
- Hane Sea Museum: has an exhibition of traditional fishing techniques and a collection of canoes from all eras by Joseph Va'atete, the museum's curator.
- Geological Museum, Hakatu
- Petroglyph Museum, Hakatu
- Stone Museum, in Hakatu
- Garden Forest Museum: located in the arboretum

In each village there is also a handicraft exhibition centre. Every year in June, a competition is held among the craftsmen of Ua Huka to copy old objects. This ensures that the ancient techniques of carving and engraving are not lost.

== Politics and government ==
The island is currently politically part of the Overseas Country (Pays d'outre-mer - POM) of French Polynesia and is therefore affiliated with the European Union. It is administered by a subdivision (Subdivision administrative des Îles Marquises) of the High Commissariat of the Republic in French Polynesia (Haut-commissariat de la République en Polynésie française) based in Papeete. Ua Huka forms an independent municipality (Commune de Ua Huka) with 633 inhabitants (2012). The population density is about 7 inhabitants/km^{2}.

The official language is French. There are three villages in Ua Huka, all on the south coast: Vaipae'e, Hane and Hokatu. The main village and seat of local government is the village of Vaipae'e. Vaipae'e is the largest and Hokatu the smallest of the three settlements. The entire northern part of the island is uninhabited.

== Infrastructure ==
Ua Huka is supplied with goods not produced on the island by a cargo and passenger ship that arrives regularly from Tahiti. The Aranui 5 calls at Ua Huka once a month. This is also the best way for tourists to reach the island. The ship cannot dock at Vaipae'e's small pier, so it has to be loaded and unloaded by boats.

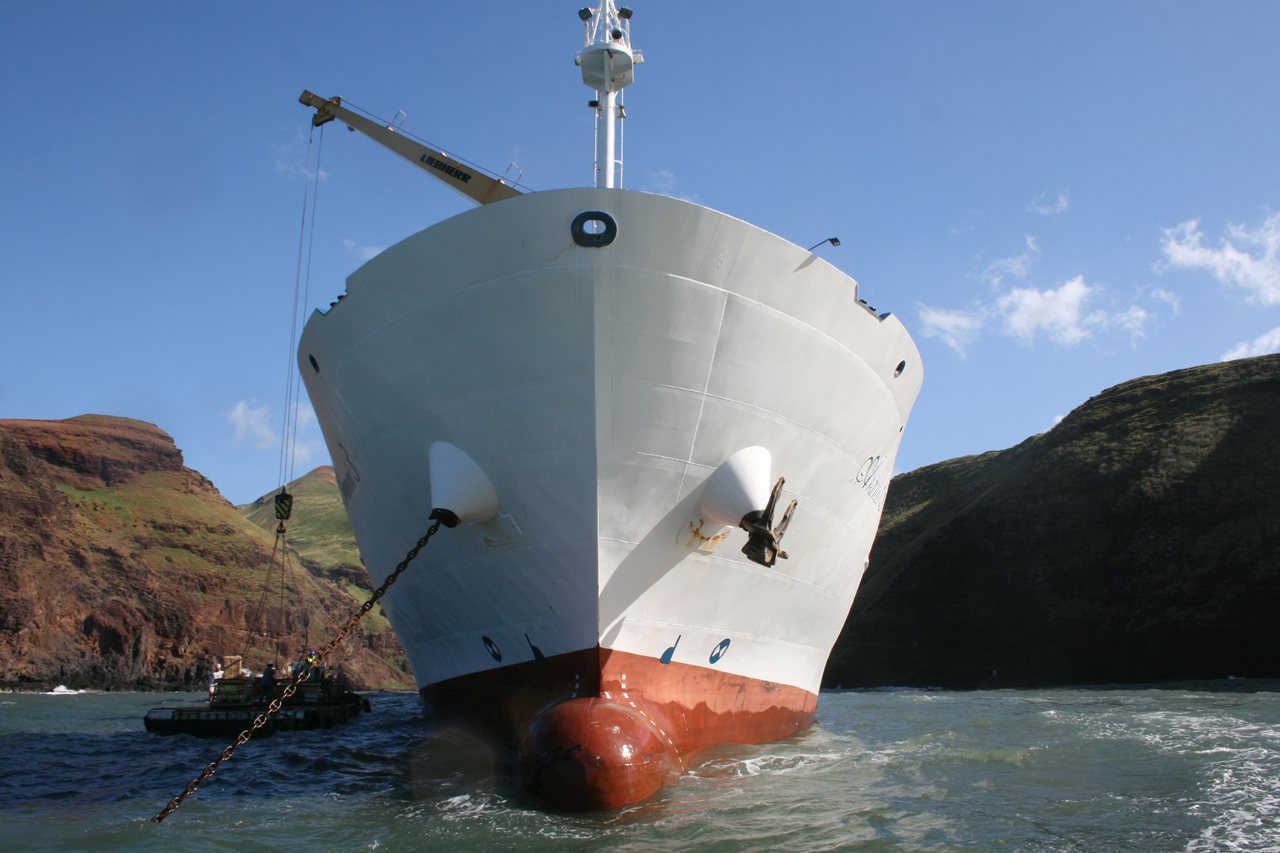
The ship Aranui 3 on the island

Opened in 1972, Ua Huka Airport (IATA: UAH, ICAO: NTMU) consists of a single 755 m asphalt runway and is located between the villages of Vaipae'e and Hane. It is served exclusively by Air Tahiti with small aircraft via Nuku Hiva (flight time approximately 30 minutes).

The three villages and the airfield are connected by a paved road, the rest of the island is undeveloped or accessible only by roads and trails.

The tourist infrastructure is modest. There are no hotels, but there are a few privately run guesthouses, restaurants, and small shops with a limited range of products, open at the discretion of the owners. There is no bank on the island and credit cards are not accepted (since 2000).

In Vaipae'e, the most populated village, there is a town hall with local administration, a post office (with satellite phone), a first aid station, a nursery and a primary school (école maternelle et primaire). Secondary schools and qualified medical care are only available in Nuku Hiva and Papeete.

== See also ==
- Overseas France
- Dependent territory
