= Lucien Berland =

French entomologist and arachnologist

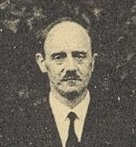
- L. Berland at the International Congress of Entomology in Madrid, 1935
- Born: 14 May 1888; Aÿ
- Died: 18 August 1962 (aged 74); Versailles
- Alma mater: University of Paris; Lycée Charlemagne
- Academic career
- Fields: Entomology and arachnology

Lucien Berland (14 May 1888 in Ay, Marne – 18 August 1962 in Versailles) was a French entomologist and arachnologist.

== Partial list of publications ==
- 1925 : Faune de France. 10, Hyménoptères vespiformes, I, Sphegidae, Pompilidae, Scoliidae, Sapygidae, Mutillidae(Paul Lechevalier, Paris)
- 1927 : « Les Araignées ubiquistes, ou à large répartition, et leurs moyens de dissémination », Compte rendu sommaire des séances de la Société de biogéographie, 23 : 65–67.
- 1929 : Faune de France. 19, Hyménoptères vespiformes, II, Eumenidae, Vespidae, Masaridae, Bethylidae, Dryinidae, Embolemidae (Paul Lechevalier, Paris)
- 1929 : « Araignées recueillies par Madame Pruvot aux îles Loyalty », Bulletin de la Société zoologique de France, LIV : 387–399.
- 1929 : avec Léon Bertin (1896–1954), La Faune de la France. Fascicule 2. Arachnides et Crustacés (Delagrave, Paris).
- 1930 : « Curieuse anomalie oculaire chez une araignée », Bulletin de la Société zoologique de France, LV : 193–195.
- 1932 : Les Arachnides : (scorpions, araignées, etc.) : biologie systématique (Paul Lechevalier, Paris).
- 1933 : « Sur le parasitisme des phorides (diptères) », Bulletin de la Société zoologique de France, LVIII : 529–530.
- 1934 : « Un cas probable de parthénogenèse géographique chez Leucorpis Gigas (Hyménoptère) », Bulletin de la Société zoologique de France, LVIX : 172–175.
- 1934 : « Une nouvelle espèce de Nemoscolus (araignée) du Soudan français, et son industrie », Bulletin de la Société zoologique de France, LVIX : 247–251.
- 1934 : avec Jacques Pellegrin (1873–1944), « Sur une araignée pêcheuse de poissons », Bulletin de la Société zoologique de France, LVIX : 210–212.
- 1938 : Les Araignées (Stock, Paris, collection Les Livres de nature).
- 1938 : avec Francis Bernard (1908–1990), Faune de France. 34, Hyménoptères vespiformes. III. (Cleptidae, Crysidae, Trigonalidae) (Paul Lechevalier, Paris).
- 1939 : Les Guêpes (Stock, Paris, collection Les Livres de nature).
- 1940 : avec Raymond Benoist (1881–1970), F. Bernard et Henri Maneval (1892–1942), La Faune de la France en tableaux synoptiques illustrés... Tome 7. Hyménoptéres (Delagrave, Paris).
- 1941 : avec Jacques Millot (1897–1980), Les Araignées de l'Afrique Occidentale Française (Éditions du Muséum, Paris), Mémoires du Muséum national d'histoire naturelle. Nouvelle série. T. XII. Fascicule 2.
- 1942 : Les insectes et l'homme (Presses universitaires de France, Paris, Collection Que sais-je ?, n° 83) – troisième édition, 1962.
- 1944 : Les Scorpions (Stock, Paris, collection Les Livres de nature).
- 1947 : Atlas des hyménoptères de France, Belgique, Suisse (Boubée, Paris) – réédité en 1958, 1976.
- 1947 : Faune de France. 47, Hyménoptères tenthrédoïdes (Paul Lechevalier, Paris).
- 1955 : Les Arachnides de l'Afrique noire française (IFAN, Dakar).
- 1962 : Atlas des Névroptères de France, Belgique, Suisse. Mégaloptères, Raphidioptères, Névroptères planipennes, Mécoptères, Trichoptères (Boubée, Paris).

== Bibliography ==
- Jean-Jacques Amigo, « Berland (Lucien) », in Nouveau Dictionnaire de biographies roussillonnaises, vol. 3 Sciences de la Vie et de la Terre, Perpignan, Publications de l'olivier, 2017, 915 p. (ISBN 9782908866506)
- Lucien Chopard (1962). Lucien Berland (1888–1962), Bulletin de la Société entomologique de France, 67 (7-8) : 143–144. ISSN 0037-928X
