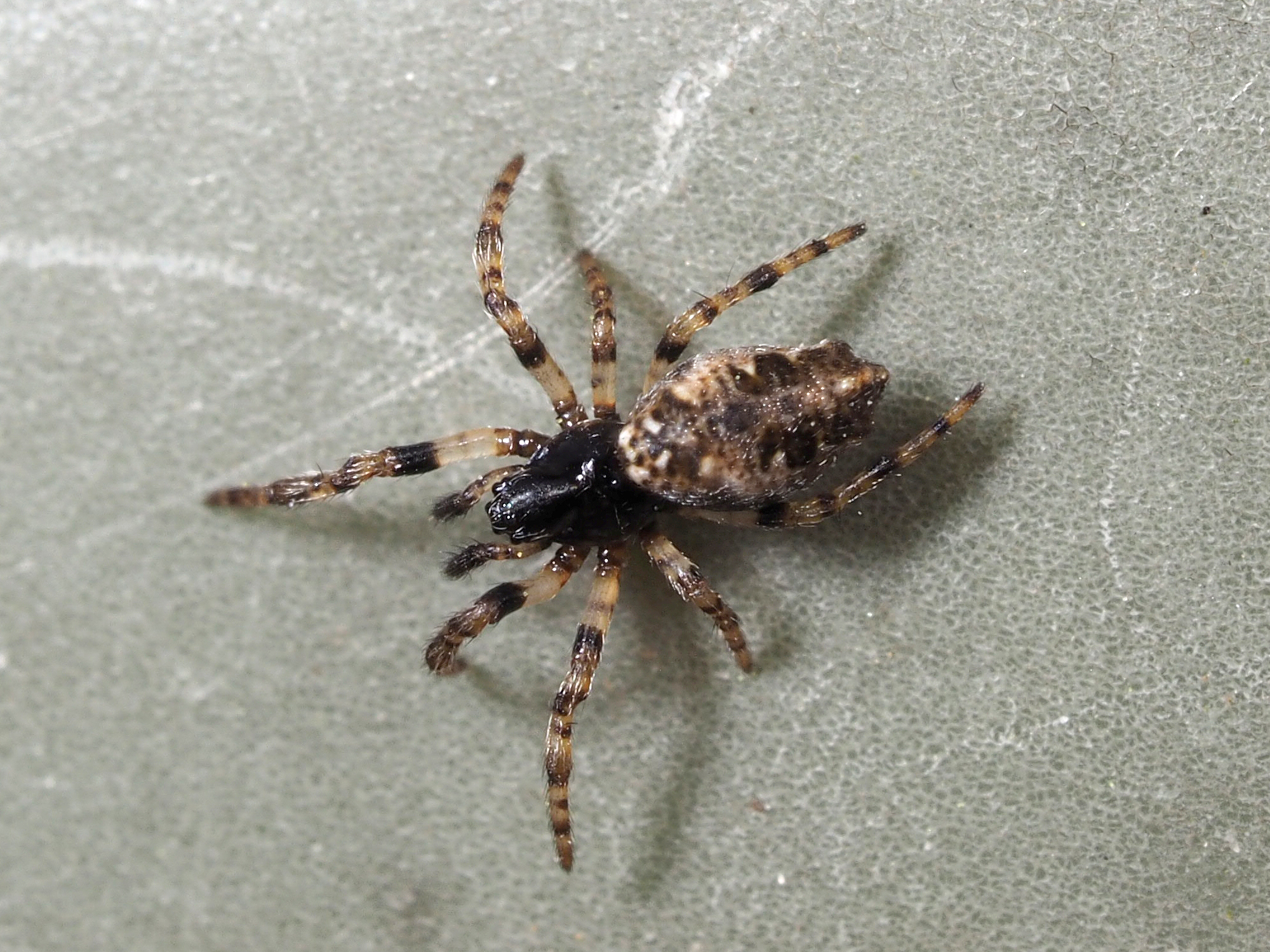
- female from Italy
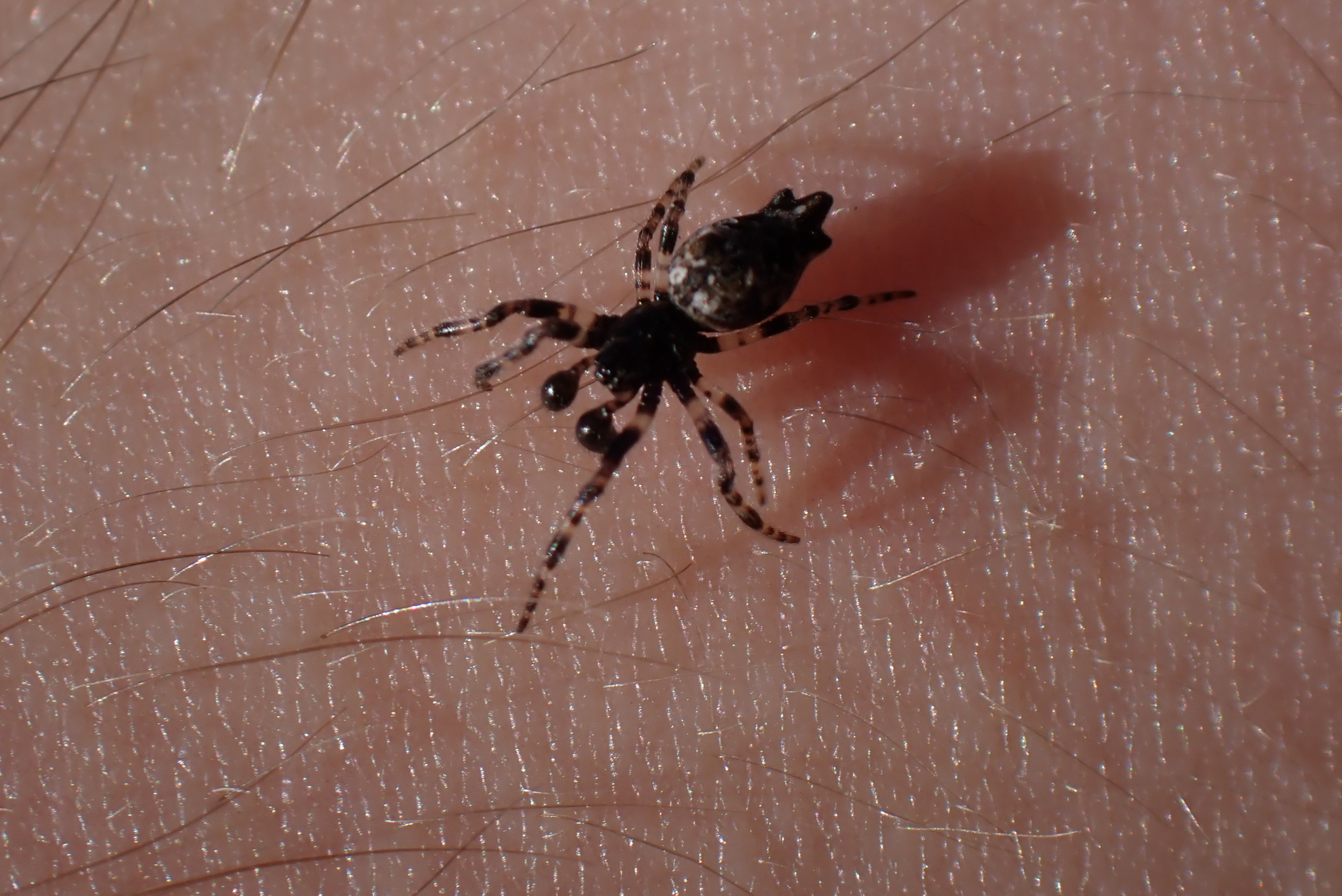
- male from France

Scientific classification
- Kingdom: Animalia
- Phylum: Arthropoda
- Subphylum: Chelicerata
- Class: Arachnida
- Order: Araneae
- Infraorder: Araneomorphae
- Family: Araneidae
- Genus: Cyclosa
- Species: C. oculata

Binomial name
- Cyclosa oculata (Walckenaer, 1802)

Synonyms
- Aranea oculata Walckenaer, 1802; Epeira oculata Walckenaer, 1805; Cyrtophora oculata Simon, 1864; Singa oculata L. Koch, 1870; Singa tuberculata Reinhard, 1874; Cyclosa walckenaeri Bryant, 1945

= Cyclosa oculata =

Oculate Garbage-line Web Spider

Species of orb-weaver spider

Cyclosa oculata is a species of orb-weaver spider in the genus Cyclosa. Originally described from Europe, it has a wide distribution across the Palearctic region and has been introduced to South Africa and Hawaii.

== Distribution ==
C. oculata is widely distributed across Europe, extending eastward through Russia to the Far East, and south through the Caucasus, Kazakhstan, and Central Asia to China. It has been introduced to South Africa and Hawaii.

In Europe, the species has been recorded from Belgium, France (including Corsica), Spain, Austria, Hungary, the Balkans, Romania, and southern Russia. It was also found in the Antilles and Venezuela. Simon suggested that the species is likely of tropical origin and was introduced to the European fauna long ago.

== Habitat and ecology ==
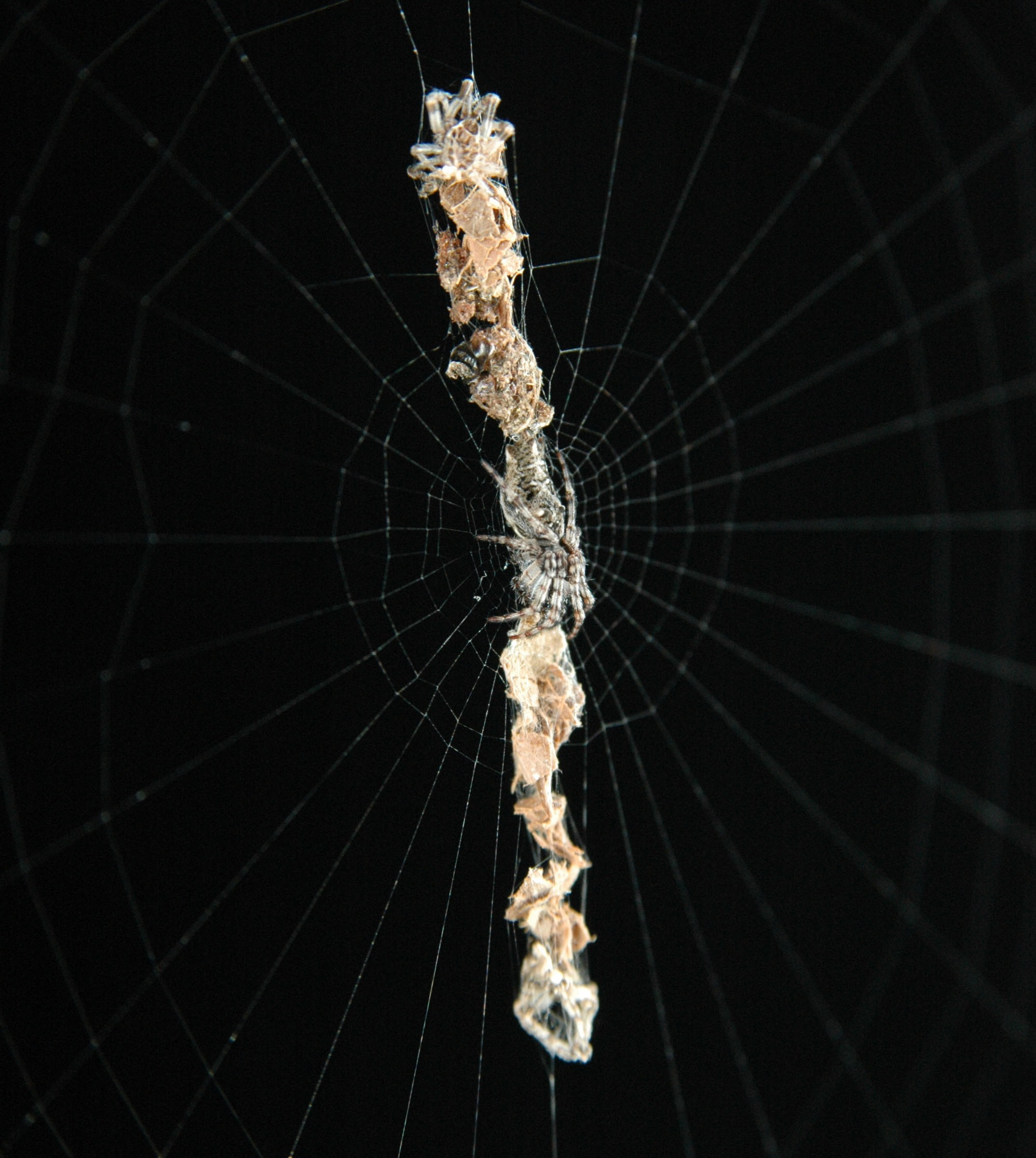
female in web

Cyclosa oculata prefers sunny wasteland areas that are little or not at all affected by cultivation, meaning areas that are neither mowed nor grazed. It is particularly found on sparse sandy soils with late-growing plants, and sometimes occurs in large numbers on such sites. However, it is absent from scrubland areas when these lie completely fallow. Warm locations are preferred. In mountainous areas, the species does not appear to ascend above 600 meters elevation.

The web is built 20–25 cm above ground level on free-standing heath plants or broom and similar vegetation. It is a typical Cyclosa web, but differs from the closely related Cyclosa conica in having fewer radial threads, making the mesh size slightly larger. The sticky catching area has a more radial extension compared to other species. In harmony with the reduced number of radial threads, fewer attachment points are present. In older animals, the web shows a greater number of catching threads.

The web often shows that the upper frame threads have been frequently strengthened through repeated use. The sticky threads in adult female webs are spaced 3–4 mm apart, becoming closer toward the outer and inner edges. The catching area measures 90–100 mm. The web does not make the regular impression of other Cyclosa species but usually has a more radial extension.

The spider sits with closely drawn legs and head downward on the web, moving to its retreat when disturbed.

== Description ==
Adult males have a cephalothorax length of 2 mm and abdomen length of 2-2.25 mm.Adult females have a cephalothorax length of 2-2.25 mm and abdomen length of 3.5 mm.

The dark brown to black sternum shows three lighter, reddish-brown round spots on each side and a similar spot at the rear tip that appears to be formed from two fused spots. The legs show distinct darker and lighter banding.

== Life cycle ==
The egg sacs are enclosed in cocoons and incorporated into the upper stabilimentum. The cocoons consist of an oval, parchment-like plate 5 mm long and 2.5 mm wide. The mass of agglutinated, ochre-colored eggs (14-26 pieces) is deposited on this plate. The egg mass is surrounded by a brown fleece. Externally, it is closed off by a gray roof-like covering resembling the base. These brown egg spindles are woven lengthwise into the upper stabilimentum. Often they lie tile-like over each other, sometimes arranged in a rosette pattern, occasionally also from different sides in groups of 2–5 on the stabilimentum.

The first juveniles emerge at the end of July; mature males and females are found from the end of June to early July.

== Taxonomy ==
The species was originally described by Charles Athanase Walckenaer in 1802 as Aranea oculata. It has been placed in several different genera over time, including Epeira, Cyrtophora, and Singa, before being definitively placed in Cyclosa by Eugène Simon in 1874.

The synonymy of Singa tuberculata Reinhard, 1874 was established by Charitonov in 1932. Cyclosa walckenaeri was synonymized by Bryant in 1945 but later revalidated by Levi in 1977.

== Conservation ==
Cyclosa oculata is listed as Least Concern by the South African National Biodiversity Institute due to its wide geographical range. The species is protected in Umgeni Valley Nature Reserve, Makalali Nature Reserve, De Hoop Nature Reserve, Kirstenbosch National Botanical Garden, and Table Mountain National Park.
