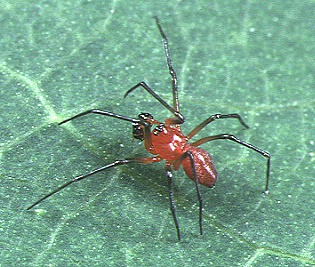
- N. anguinolentus, male

Scientific classification
- Kingdom: Animalia
- Phylum: Arthropoda
- Subphylum: Chelicerata
- Class: Arachnida
- Order: Araneae
- Infraorder: Araneomorphae
- Family: Linyphiidae
- Genus: Nematogmus; Simon, 1884

Type species
- N. sanguinolentus (Walckenaer, 1841)

Species
- 9, see text

= Nematogmus =

Genus of spiders

Nematogmus is a genus of dwarf spiders that was first described by Eugène Louis Simon in 1884.

== Species ==
As of May 2019 it contains nine species:

- Nematogmus asiaticus Tanasevitch, 2014 – Laos, Thailand, Indonesia (Sumatra)
- Nematogmus dentimanus Simon, 1886 – Sri Lanka to Malaysia, Indonesia (Java, Krakatau)
- Nematogmus digitatus Fei & Zhu, 1994 – China
- Nematogmus longior Song & Li, 2008 – China
- Nematogmus membranifer Song & Li, 2008 – China
- Nematogmus nigripes Hu, 2001 – China
- Nematogmus rutilis Oi, 1960 – Japan
- Nematogmus sanguinolentus (Walckenaer, 1841) (type) – Europe, North Africa, Caucasus, China, Korea, Japan
- Nematogmus stylitus (Bösenberg & Strand, 1906) – China, Japan
