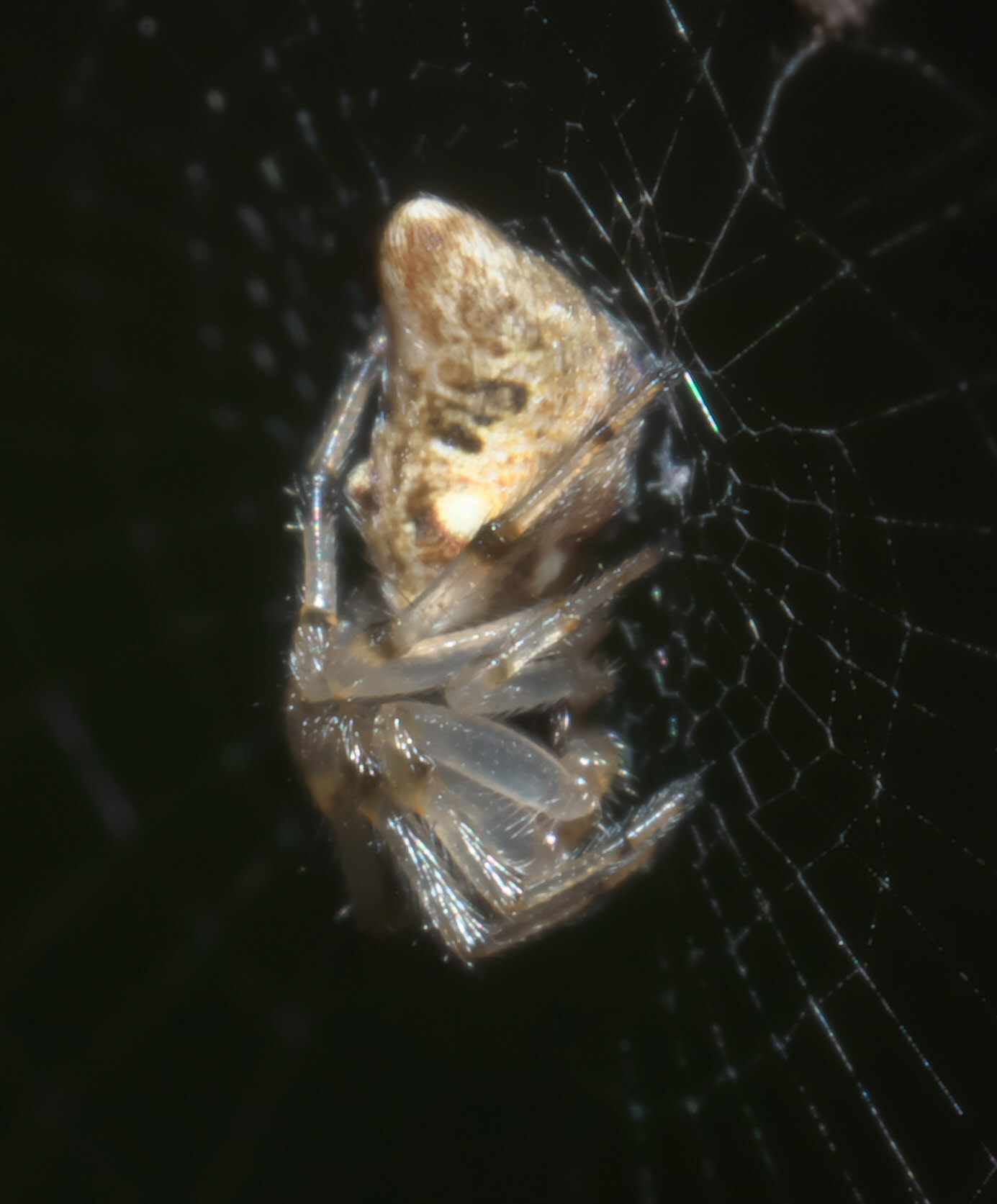

Scientific classification
- Kingdom: Animalia
- Phylum: Arthropoda
- Subphylum: Chelicerata
- Class: Arachnida
- Order: Araneae
- Infraorder: Araneomorphae
- Family: Araneidae
- Genus: Cyclosa
- Species: C. turbinata

Binomial name
- Cyclosa turbinata (Walckenaer, 1841)

= Cyclosa turbinata =

Species of spider

Cyclosa turbinata is a species of orb weaver belonging to the family of spiders known as Araneidae. It is found in a range from the United States to Panama, West Indies, Galapagos Islands, and has been introduced into Hawaii.

== Geographic distribution ==
The spider is native to the continental United States, and Mexico, but has been introduced and found in places across Hawaii, the Caribbean, Middle, and South America, the Galapagos Islands, and even Oceania. Its large geographic range is likely due to its ability to travel through the wind using its silk to catch the current. Five species of Cyclosa occur in the continental United States.

== Etymology ==
The specific name is derived from the Latin word turbo, meaning spinning top, in reference to the spider's top-shaped body and its wheel-shaped webs.

== Description ==
Cyclosa turbinata is a relatively small species with sizes about 4– 7 mm in length. Their color is a mix of browns, blacks, and whites, and their abdomen tapers to a rounded point, hence their given name.

Females are typically within 3.3 and 5.2 mm in body length, while males are on average 2.5 mm long.

Males are most active from March to September, while females are more active from March to October. Females of Cyclosa turbinata can be differentiated from females of Cyclosa conica, a very similar species, by their smaller size and the presence of two anterior dorsal humps.

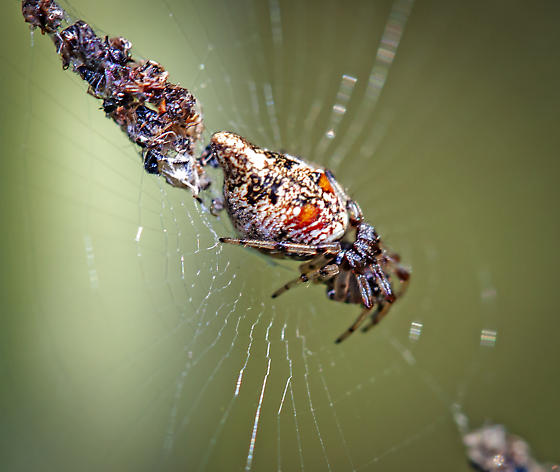
Trashline Orbweaver (Cyclosa turbinata)

Mangora gibberosa, otherwise known as the lined orbweaver, is also commonly misidentified as C. turbinata due to its similar appearance and orb-style webs.

== Protective behaviors ==
Experimental results have shown that when Cyclosa turbinata is confronted with a predator stimulus, the species shows thanatosis behavior more frequently, and for longer durations during the day.

Some experts believe that increased thanatosis behavior during the daytime may correspond to an increased fitness cost associated with fleeing the web hub during the nighttime when prey is most abundant.

It is believed that C. turbinata does not sacrifice predator vigilance for increased foraging efforts because the period of highest foraging aggression coincides with the period during which C. turbinata is most likely to leave the foraging area because of predators.

== Bites ==
C. turbinata spiders are known to be both biting and venomous, but their bites are thought to be unable to seriously injure healthy humans and other large animals, such as dogs.

== Predators ==
Hymenopterans, specifically wasps, are a primary source of predation and parasitism in C. turbinata. The diet of sphecid wasps contains up to 75% orb-weaving spiders, and these two populations live in close proximity across much of North America. Experts agree that female C. turbinata generally starts foraging at lower levels of energy reserves during the middle of the day when predators are most abundant. Because their visually oriented predators are mostly diurnal, female C. turbinata is expected to mostly ignore potential prey in the day time and instead complete their foraging at night to avoid revealing their presence to predators.

== Habitat ==
Cyclosa turbinata are found across North America, Mexico, and the northern regions of South America. They are extremely common along forest edges and fencing.

Cyclosa turbinata have been found on cotton and peanut crops, grassland pastures, on sand dunes, shrubs, pecan orchards, and various plants such as bluebonnets, croton, prickly pear, Baccharis, and Monarda citriodora. In woodland habitats, they favor live oak, Quercus buckleyi, Quercus virginiana, and Ulmus crassifolia trees, building their webs in hollow sycamore trees or in shrubs.

One reason these spiders are thought to be so widely distributed is that their young can efficiently travel through the air via wind currents. The spiderling first climbs onto a perch and extends a line of silk into the air. The wind catches the silk, and when the silk is long enough and the tug powerful enough, the spiderling releases its grip on the perch and flies through the air. This allows the species to colonize vast areas of land.

Five species of Cyclosa occur in North America north of Mexico, and these species differ in how their webs are positioned within vegetation, and for that reason, species diversity is highest in habitats that have high architectural and botanic diversity.

== Web ==
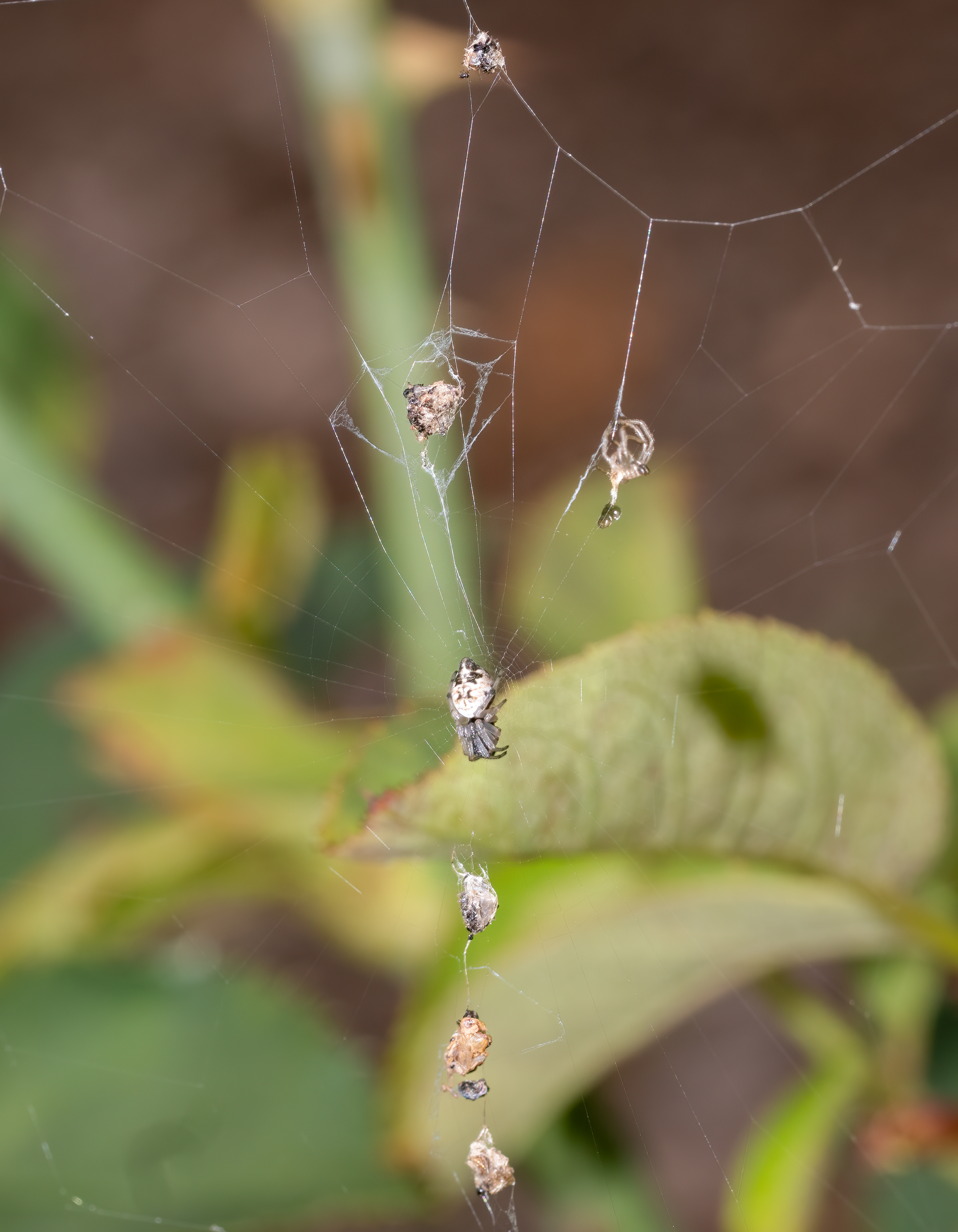
Spider at the center of its "trashline" web

Known to readily construct webs within wooden frames both in the field and in the laboratory, the spider Cyclosa turbinata are known for creating orb-shaped webs, which are webs that utilize both the sticky and non-sticky threads, mostly during times of complete darkness. Across its spiral wheel-shaped web, the Cyclosa turbinata is unique in that it also creates the so-called "trashline" web, which is a line of various components such as prey's carcasses, detritus, and, at times, egg cases. This trashline appears to hinder the predators from visually locating the spider within its web. The trashline helps the spider to camouflage exceptionally well. But, even though the trashline itself attracts attacking wasps, these wasps are unable to locate the spider within the web since the debris of the web's decoration is of similar color, size, and shape as the spider itself. Because of the variability in the amount of silk reserves the spider has, webs of different diameters may be created. However, larger web diameters do not impact the insect-trapping efficiency of stabilimenta-adorned webs, and instead, the efficiency is dependent solely on the presence of stabilimenta, a type of web decoration.

Specifically for the female spider, they occupy the web hub, which is the center, almost continuously and conduct their sit-and-wait foraging behavior. This behavior allows the female spiders to ensnare prey at nearly any time of day, and they only leave their spot to replace the web prior to sunrise. However, the prey that gets stuck to the web are still sometimes able to release itself, which gives the spiders another reason to leave the security of the web hub to ensure the prey is fully captured. Due to this, pursuing an increase in energy reserves comes at the direct cost of increased exposure to visual predators such as wasps, and females must balance these two to maximize their fitness and reproductive success.

The size of the prey that is captured using the web is actually related to the physical size of the spider and not so much the spider's life stage. So in addition, when Cyclosa turbinata spiders' are under poor nutritional conditions, they strategically assess their silk resources before initiating web construction and alter their behavior to produce a highly regular web in spite of their diminished silk reserves. Since prey discrimination through interpretation of web-borne vibrations is found to not be as feasible in Cyclosa turbinata spiders, Cyclosa turbinata spiders shake their webs back and forth, possibly to warn other larger animals of the webs existence in order to drive it away when they feel threatened.

It is also known that juveniles Cyclosa turbinata build their webs higher above the ground than spiders of other Cyclosa species and both juvenile and adult Cyclosa turbinata have the widest mesh compared to the rest of the genus. Adult and juvenile Cyclosa turbinata differ most dramatically from other species in their choice of plants for attaching webs. Other Cyclosa species prefer using goldenrod, but Cyclosa turbinata is known for also using species of Ambrosia (ragweed), Asclepias (milkweed), and Cirsium (thistle).

== Prey ==
=== Prey discrimination ===
The web of Cyclosa turbinata not only can constraint the prey but also convey some information. The vibration generated by the prey can tell the spider about its size, power, and dangerousness. Experiment has shown that Cyclosa turbinata can respond to different types of vibrations. They selectively avoid some dangerous prey that can potentially cause injury during feeding. Statistical analysis showed that Cyclosa turbinata can adjust their strategies towards preys, including waiting time and frequency of turning.

=== Types of prey ===
In one study conducted in East Texas, researchers studied webs built-in mid-August with an average diameter of 9.13 inches. In these webs, 42% of the prey that had been caught had been so strongly crushed and macerated by the spider's chelicerae that they could not be identified. Among the remaining 58% of prey, aphids were most prominent, followed by small dipterans, small hymenopterans, leafhoppers, thrips, small coleopterans, and lastly red fire ants.

== Foraging ==
Cyclosa turbinata appears to forage both during daytime and nighttime; however, an experimental assay of prey capture behavior suggested that the species shows primarily nocturnal patterns of foraging aggression because C. turbinata is more likely to attack at night than during the day. This indicates that C. turbinata forages across the diel cycle, but modulates its foraging aggression in a regular fashion.

== Reproduction ==
Reports have stated that Cyclosa turbinata spiders are bivoltine, meaning that they reproduce once in the late spring and once again in the fall.

According to a study conducted in 1984, C. turbinata has two generations per year. The first generation matures and reproduces in late spring and dies in early summer, and the second generation matures and reproduces during the summer and dies during the fall and winter.

C. turbinata spiders reach full maturation in the spring, but when males become mature, they do not spin webs, but instead travel away from their home in search of potential mates. Females do spin webs and when they mate, they can create up to five egg sacs which will be hidden by the female in the surrounding foliage.

== Behavior ==
Cyclosa turbinata is unique in that its locomotor and web-building activity cause it to have an exceptionally short-period circadian clock, about 19 hours. Current research is being conducted to understand how web-building behavior may be regulated by this endogenous circadian control in this species.

In an experiment where C. turbinata spiders were placed into chambers with periods of 19, 24, or 29 hours of evenly split light and dark, none of the spiders exhibited decreased longevity in their own circadian clock. These findings contradicted all previous research into circadian resonance and suggest that C. turbinata do not suffer the same costs of extreme desynchronization as do other species of animals.

C. turbinata are also unique in their collection of prey carcasses along a so-called 'trashline' on their web. This advanced protective behavior allows the spider to stay on its web but remain inconspicuous to its predators.
