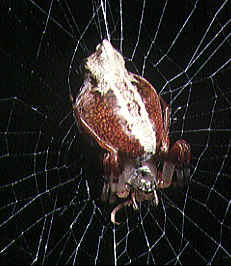
- female from Okinawa
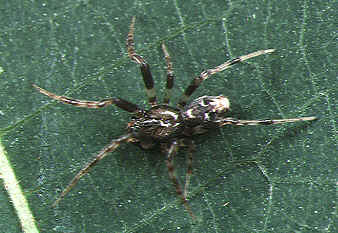
- male from Okinawa

Scientific classification
- Kingdom: Animalia
- Phylum: Arthropoda
- Subphylum: Chelicerata
- Class: Arachnida
- Order: Araneae
- Infraorder: Araneomorphae
- Family: Araneidae
- Genus: Cyclosa
- Species: C. confusa

Binomial name
- Cyclosa confusa Bösenberg & Strand, 1906

Synonyms
- Cyclosa insulana misidentified by Chikuni, 1989

= Cyclosa confusa =

Species of orb-weaver spider

Cyclosa confusa is a species of orb-weaver spider in the family Araneidae. The species was first described by Bösenberg and Strand in 1906. It is widely distributed across East Asia, occurring in Japan, Korea, China, and Taiwan.

== Taxonomy ==
The species was originally described by Bösenberg and Strand in 1906 based on a male specimen from Japan. The holotype is housed in the Senckenberg Museum, Frankfurt am Main, Germany.

Tanikawa conducted a comprehensive revisional study of Japanese Cyclosa species in 1992, providing detailed descriptions of both male and female specimens and clarifying the taxonomic status of C. confusa. Prior to this revision, some specimens had been misidentified as Cyclosa insulana by Chikuni in 1989.

== Distribution ==
C. confusa has been recorded from Japan (including Honshu, Kyushu, the Satsunan Islands, Tokara Islands, Amami Islands, Okinawa Islands, Daito Islands, Miyako Islands, and Yaeyama Islands), Taiwan, China, and Korea.

== Habitat ==
The species has been collected from various locations across its range, suggesting it occupies diverse habitats from mainland areas to offshore islands.

== Description ==
Cyclosa confusa exhibits considerable size variation, with females measuring 5.0–8.0 mm in body length and males 3.0–4.5 mm. The carapace is typically pale brown, often with dark brown margins and median band, though some individuals may be uniformly dark brown.

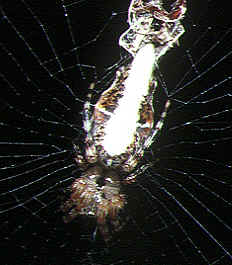
variation in females

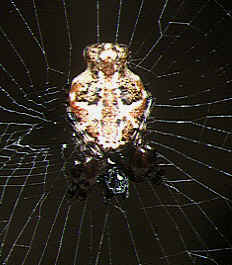

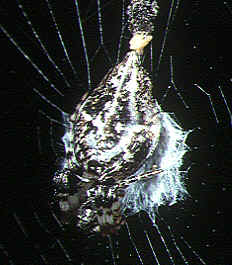

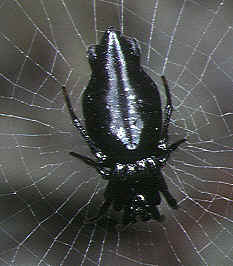

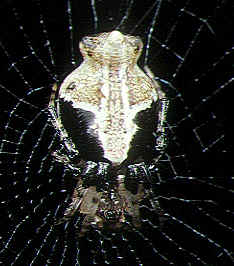

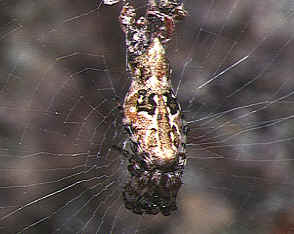

The species shows remarkable variation in abdominal coloration and markings. Females may have black abdomens with longitudinal brown median bands mottled with black, or pale brown coloration mottled with silver and featuring X-shaped silver markings. The posterior end of the abdomen bears three distinct protuberances, which are often less distinct in males.

Males can be distinguished by their pedipalp structure, particularly the median apophysis which is distally bent and bifurcated, distinguishing it from related species such as Cyclosa insulana, Cyclosa dives, and Cyclosa albisternis where this structure is distally truncated.
