= Cyclosa bifurcata =

Scientific classification
- Kingdom: Animalia
- Phylum: Arthropoda
- Subphylum: Chelicerata
- Class: Arachnida
- Order: Araneae
- Infraorder: Araneomorphae
- Family: Araneidae
- Genus: Cyclosa
- Species: C. bifurcata

Binomial name
- Cyclosa bifurcata (Walckenaer, 1841)

Species of spider

Cyclosa bifurcata is a species of spider in the orb-weaver family Araneidae, found in South America (Costa Rica, Hispaniola to Argentina). (Cyclosa bifurcata Kishida, 1931 is a different species, now regarded as a synonym of Cyrtophora exanthematica.)

== Taxonomy ==
The species was first described by Charles Walckenaer in 1841 as Epeira bifurcata. It was transferred to the genus Cyclosa as Cyclosa bifurcata in 1991 by Herbert Walter Levi.
