= Tychicus (spider) =

Scientific classification
- Kingdom: Animalia
- Phylum: Arthropoda
- Subphylum: Chelicerata
- Class: Arachnida
- Order: Araneae
- Infraorder: Araneomorphae
- Family: Sparassidae
- Genus: Tychicus; Simon, 1880

Type species
- T. longipes (Walckenaer, 1837)

Species
- 5, see text

Genus of spiders

Tychicus is a genus of huntsman spiders that was first described by Eugène Louis Simon in 1880.

== Species ==
As of September 2019 it contains five species, found in Indonesia, the Philippines, and Papua New Guinea:

- Tychicus erythrophthalmus Simon, 1897 – Philippines
- Tychicus gaymardi Simon, 1880 – Papua New Guinea (Bismarck Arch.)
- Tychicus genitalis Strand, 1911 – New Guinea
- Tychicus longipes (Walckenaer, 1837) (type) – Indonesia (Ambon)
- Tychicus rufoides Strand, 1911 – Admiralty Is.
