= Cyclosa elongata =

Long-Tailed Garbage-Line Web Spider

Conservation status
- Least Concern (SANBI Red List)

Scientific classification
- Kingdom: Animalia
- Phylum: Arthropoda
- Subphylum: Chelicerata
- Class: Arachnida
- Order: Araneae
- Infraorder: Araneomorphae
- Family: Araneidae
- Genus: Cyclosa
- Species: C. elongata

Binomial name
- Cyclosa elongata (Lawrence, 1947)

Synonyms
- Nemoscolus elongatus Lawrence, 1947

Species of spider

Cyclosa elongata is a species of spider in the family Araneidae. It is endemic to South Africa and is commonly known as the long-tailed garbage-line web spider.

== Distribution ==
Cyclosa elongata has a wide distribution across four South African provinces, Eastern Cape, KwaZulu-Natal, Limpopo, and Mpumalanga. Notable locations include Addo Elephant National Park, Baviaanskloof Nature Reserve, iSimangaliso Wetland Park, Ndumo Game Reserve, Kruger National Park, and Tembe Elephant Park.

== Habitat and ecology ==
The species inhabits multiple biomes including Grassland, Savanna, and Forest biomes at altitudes ranging from 4 to 1519 m above sea level. The species makes a vertical orb web with a stabilimentum of prey remains. It has been sampled from citrus and pistachio orchards, and cotton fields.

== Conservation ==
Cyclosa elongata is listed as Least Concern by the South African National Biodiversity Institute due to its wide geographical range. The species is protected in 12 protected areas including Addo Elephant National Park, Baviaanskloof Nature Reserve, Kruger National Park, and Ndumo Game Reserve.

== Taxonomy ==
The species was originally described as Nemoscolus elongatus by Reginald Frederick Lawrence in 1947, but was later transferred to the genus Cyclosa. The species has not been revised and is known only from the female.
