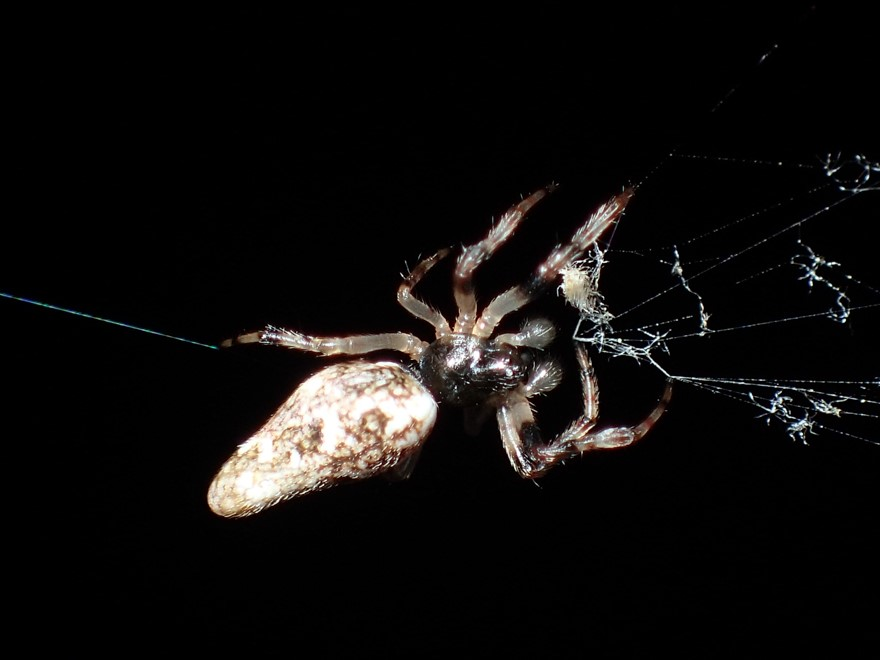

Scientific classification
- Domain: Eukaryota
- Kingdom: Animalia
- Phylum: Arthropoda
- Subphylum: Chelicerata
- Class: Arachnida
- Order: Araneae
- Infraorder: Araneomorphae
- Family: Araneidae
- Genus: Cyclosa
- Species: C. caroli

Binomial name
- Cyclosa caroli (Hentz, 1850)

= Cyclosa caroli =

Species of spider

Cyclosa caroli is a species of orb weaver in the spider family Araneidae. It is found in the United States and a range from the Caribbean Sea to Bolivia.
