= Nematogmus dentimanus =

Scientific classification
- Kingdom: Animalia
- Phylum: Arthropoda
- Subphylum: Chelicerata
- Class: Arachnida
- Order: Araneae
- Infraorder: Araneomorphae
- Family: Linyphiidae
- Genus: Nematogmus
- Species: N. dentimanus

Binomial name
- Nematogmus dentimanus Simon, 1886

Species of spider

Nematogmus dentimanus, is a species of spider of the genus Nematogmus. It is found from Sri Lanka to Malaysia, Java, Krakatau.
