= Cyclosa hamulata =

Scientific classification
- Kingdom: Animalia
- Phylum: Arthropoda
- Subphylum: Chelicerata
- Class: Arachnida
- Order: Araneae
- Infraorder: Araneomorphae
- Family: Araneidae
- Genus: Cyclosa
- Species: C. hamulata

Binomial name
- Cyclosa hamulata Tanikawa, 1992

Species of spider

Cyclosa hamulata is a species of orb weaver spider in the family Araneidae. The species was first described by Akio Tanikawa in 1992. It is found in Japan and the Russian Far East.

== Taxonomy ==
The species was originally misidentified as Cyclosa atrata by Chikuni in 1989, but Tanikawa recognized it as a distinct species in 1992 and formally described it. The species closely resembles C. atrata but can be distinguished by genital structures.

== Distribution ==
C. hamulata has been recorded from various locations across Japan, including prefectures such as Saitama, Nagano, Kanagawa, Yamanashi, Shizuoka, Mie, Hokkaido, Akita, Tochigi, Kyoto, Osaka, and Hyogo. The species also occurs in the Russian Far East.

== Description ==
=== Female ===
Female C. hamulata have a body length ranging from 6.73 to 11.44 mm.

The carapace is dark brown, while the abdomen shows variation in coloration, appearing either black with one or two pairs of silver spots, or silvery brown with dark markings and sometimes silver spots. The abdomen is slender with a caudally bifurcated end and features a pair of lateral humps positioned about one-quarter to one-third from the caudal end.

=== Male ===
Males are considerably smaller than females, with a body length of 4.08–4.85 mm.

The male carapace is dark brown, and the abdomen is typically black, sometimes featuring two pairs of silver spots. A distinctive feature of males is the hook-shaped distal part of the median apophysis of the palp, which is the source of the species' name.

== Etymology ==
The specific name "hamulata" refers to the hook-shaped (Latin: hamulus, meaning small hook) distal part of the median apophysis found in the male palp.
