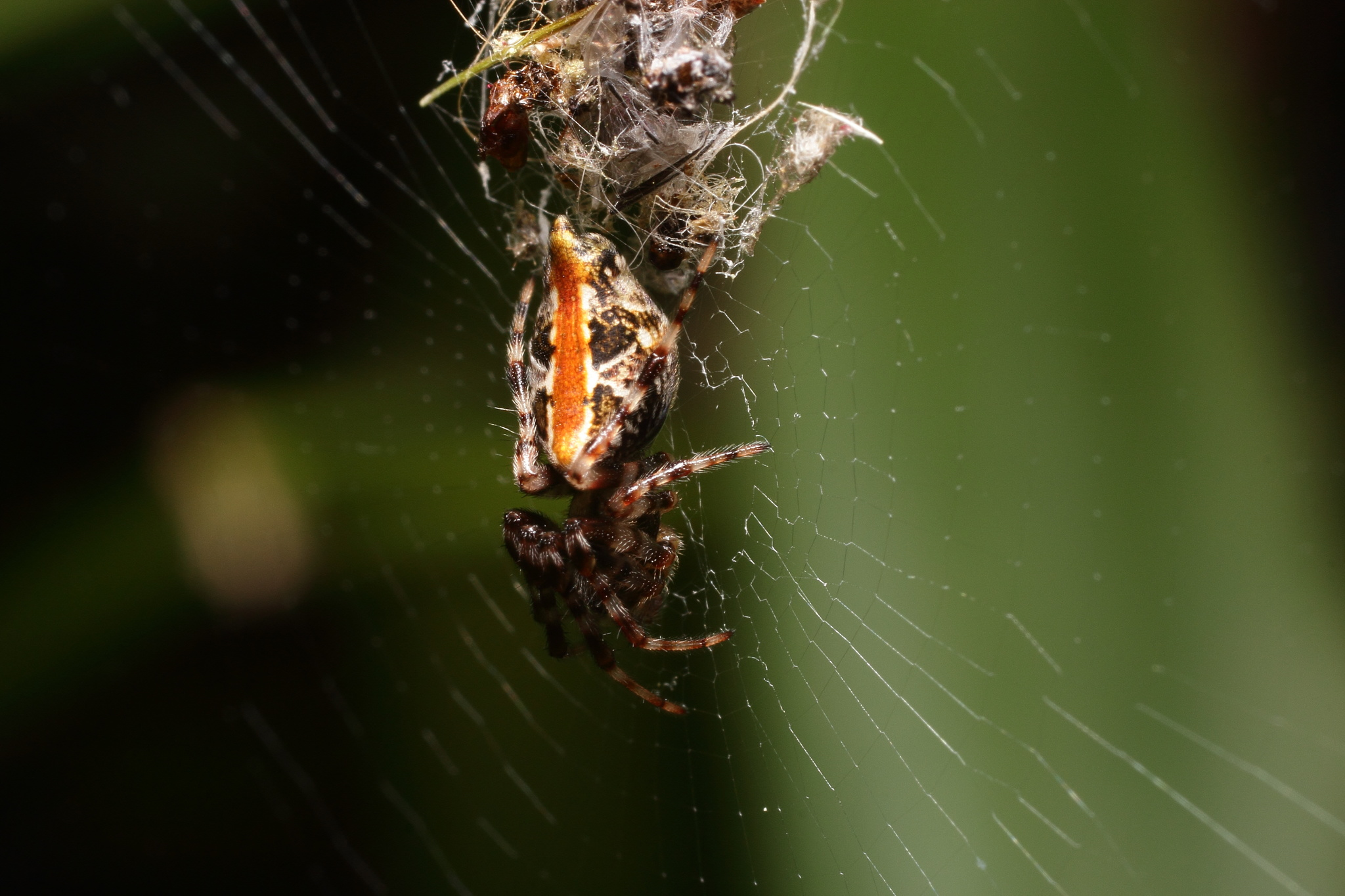
- female from Japan
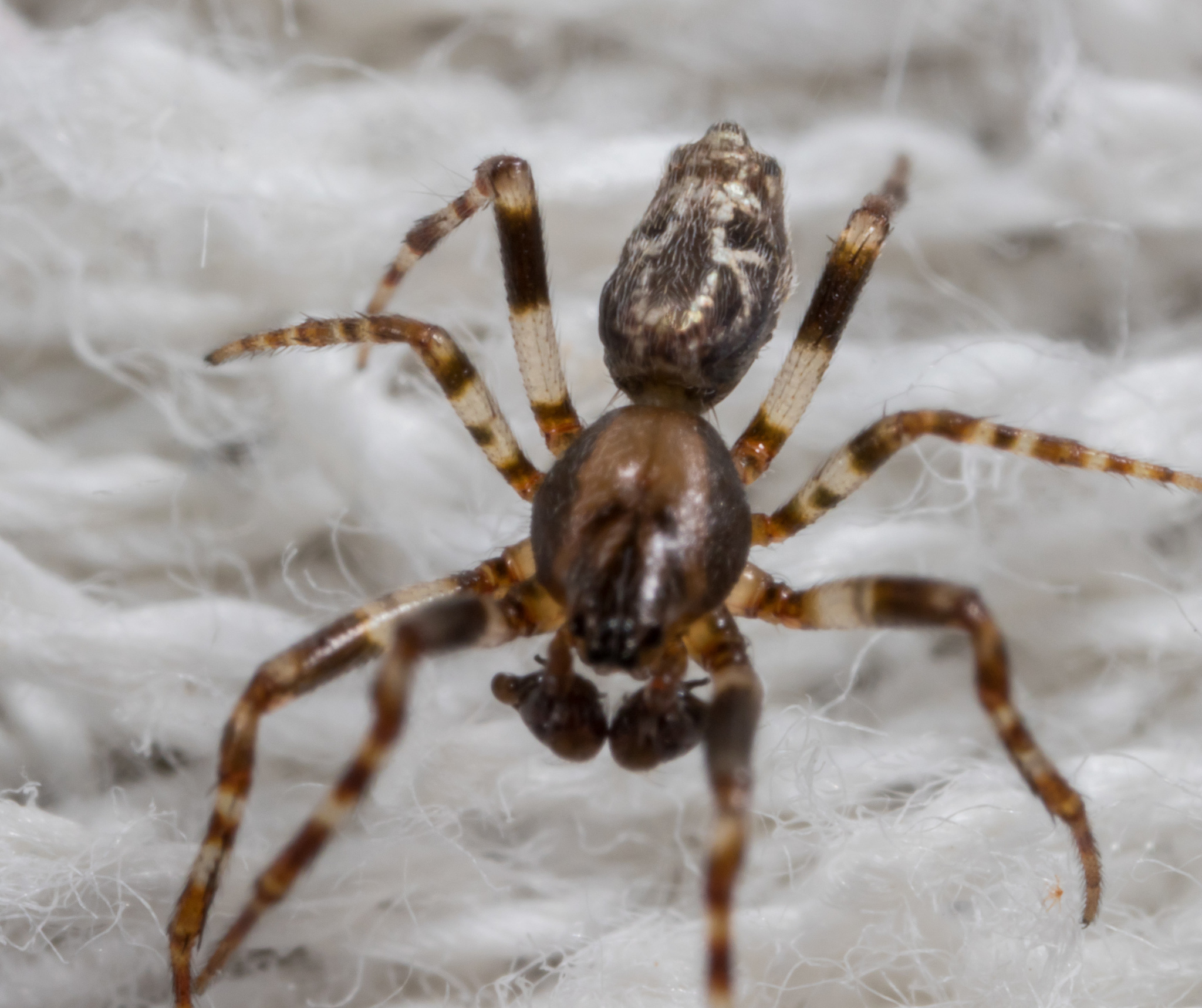
- male from Hong Kong

Scientific classification
- Kingdom: Animalia
- Phylum: Arthropoda
- Subphylum: Chelicerata
- Class: Arachnida
- Order: Araneae
- Infraorder: Araneomorphae
- Family: Araneidae
- Genus: Cyclosa
- Species: C. omonaga

Binomial name
- Cyclosa omonaga Tanikawa, 1992

= Cyclosa omonaga =

Species of spider

Cyclosa omonaga is a species of orb-weaver spider in the family Araneidae. The species name "omonaga" (おもなが) comes from the Japanese word meaning "long-faced", referring to the shape of the carapace.

== Taxonomy ==
The species was first described by Akio Tanikawa in 1992 based on specimens collected from various locations across Japan. Prior to its formal description, specimens of this species had been misidentified as other Cyclosa species, including C. insulana, C. japonica, and others in various publications.

== Distribution ==
C. omonaga has been recorded from China, Korea, Taiwan, and Japan. In Japan, the species has been found in multiple prefectures including Okayama, Mie, Wakayama, Nara, Shimane, Kagawa, Ehime, Fukuoka, Kumamoto, and Miyazaki.

== Description ==
Cyclosa omonaga is a medium-sized orb weaver with females measuring 4.65-8.30 mm in body length and males 3.76-4.75 mm. The carapace is pale brown and marginated with dark brown, often featuring a dark brown median line. The abdomen displays variable coloration patterns, typically silvery pale brown mottled with dark brown and silver, often with distinctive X-shaped or A-shaped silver markings.

Females possess three prominent protuberances at the posterior end of the abdomen, which distinguishes them from closely related species such as C. albisternis, which has additional paired dorsal tubercles. Males can be distinguished by the distinctive shape of the median apophysis and conductor of the palp.
