= Tychicus longipes =

Scientific classification
- Kingdom: Animalia
- Phylum: Arthropoda
- Subphylum: Chelicerata
- Class: Arachnida
- Order: Araneae
- Infraorder: Araneomorphae
- Family: Sparassidae
- Genus: Tychicus
- Species: T. longipes

Binomial name
- Tychicus longipes (Walckenaer, 1837)

Species of spider

Tychicus longipes is a spider species native to Amboina (Indonesia) and introduced in the Netherlands.
