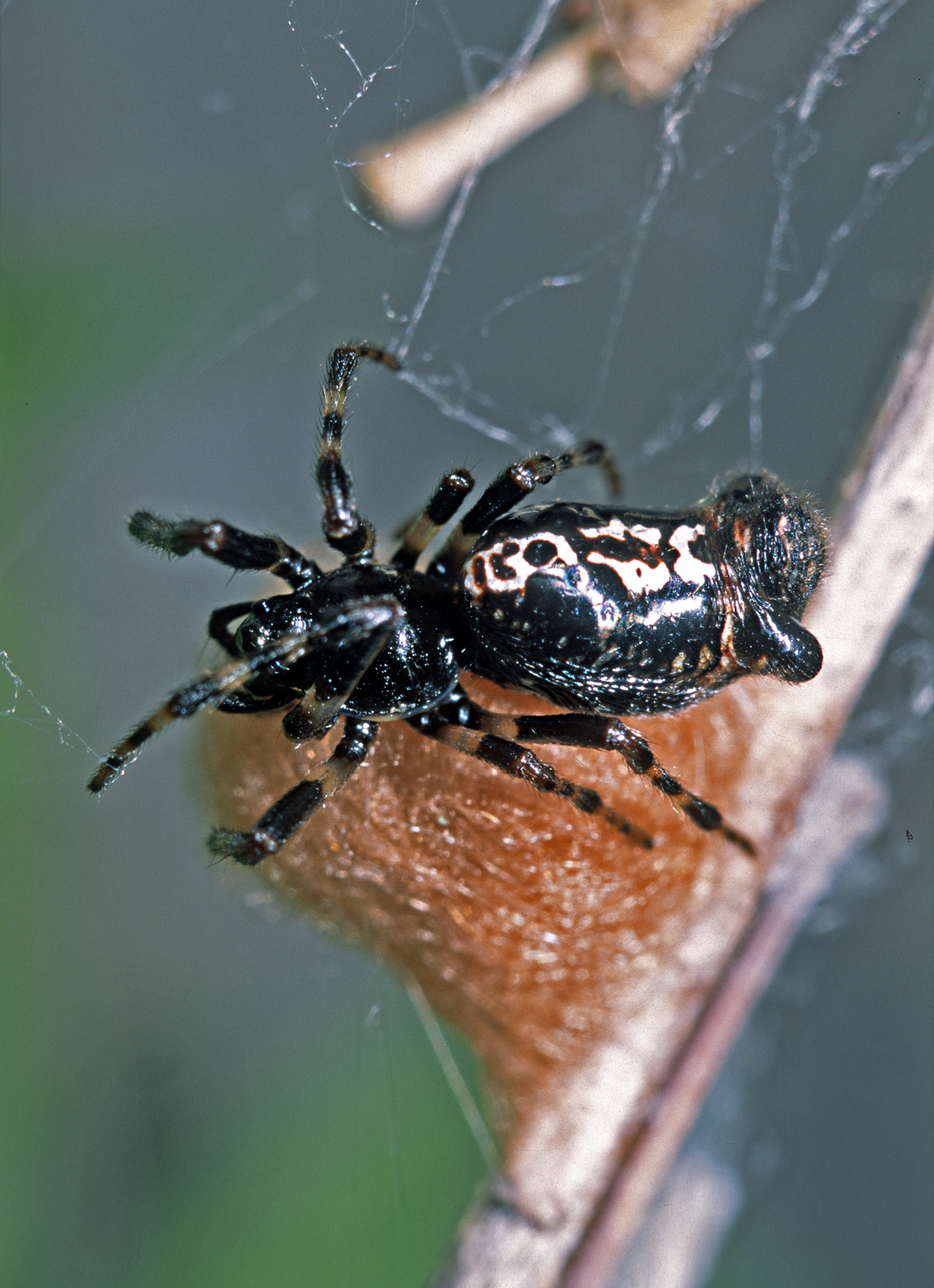

Conservation status
- Not Threatened (NZ TCS)

Scientific classification
- Domain: Eukaryota
- Kingdom: Animalia
- Phylum: Arthropoda
- Subphylum: Chelicerata
- Class: Arachnida
- Order: Araneae
- Infraorder: Araneomorphae
- Family: Araneidae
- Genus: Cyclosa
- Species: C. trilobata

Binomial name
- Cyclosa trilobata (Urquhart, 1885)

Synonyms
- Arachnura trilobata; Epeira anseripes

= Cyclosa trilobata =

Species of Arachnida

Cyclosa trilobata is a species of orb-weaver spider that is native to New Zealand and Australia.

== Taxonomy ==
This species was described as Arachnura trilobata in 1885 by Arthur Urquhart from female and male specimens collected in Auckland. It was later described from Australia. It was most recently revised in 1917, in which it was moved to the Cyclosa genus.

== Description ==
The female is recorded at 9.5mm in length whereas the male is 5mm.

== Distribution ==
This species is native to New Zealand and Australia, including Tasmania.

== Behaviour ==
The males and females are known to cohabit.

== Conservation status ==
Under the New Zealand Threat Classification System, this species is listed as "Not Threatened" with the qualifier of "Secure Overseas".
