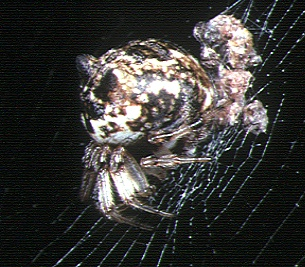
- female from Okinawa
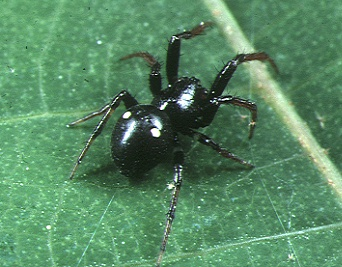
- male from Okinawa

Scientific classification
- Kingdom: Animalia
- Phylum: Arthropoda
- Subphylum: Chelicerata
- Class: Arachnida
- Order: Araneae
- Infraorder: Araneomorphae
- Family: Araneidae
- Genus: Cyclosa
- Species: C. mulmeinensis

Binomial name
- Cyclosa mulmeinensis (Thorell, 1887)

Synonyms
- Epeira mulmeinensis Thorell, 1887; Argyrodes longispinus Saitō, 1933

= Cyclosa mulmeinensis =

Species of spider

Cyclosa mulmeinensis is a species of orb-weaver spider in the family Araneidae. It was first described by Tamerlan Thorell in 1887 from specimens collected in Myanmar (then Burma). The species is widely distributed across Asia.

The species is named after Mawlamyaing (formerly Moulmein), a city in Burma where some of the first specimens were collected. It is known by the Japanese name Toge-gomigumo.

== Distribution ==
C. mulmeinensis has a broad distribution range across Asia, extending from India to East Asia, including Japan and Taiwan. The species has been recorded from numerous countries including Myanmar, India, China, Japan, Bangladesh, Singapore, Philippines, and various islands in the Ryukyu Islands.

== Description ==
C. mulmeinensis is a small to medium-sized orb-weaver spider with notable sexual dimorphism in size and coloration. On Orchid Island, off the southeast coast of Taiwan, the species makes web decorations similar in size and appearance to itself that act as decoys to distract predatory wasps.

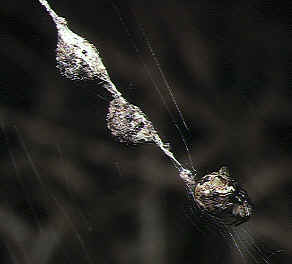
female with egg sac

=== Female ===
The female is larger than the male, with a body length ranging from 3.42 to 5.00 mm. The carapace measures 1.44–1.70 mm in length and 1.17–1.47 mm in width, while the abdomen is 2.00–3.03 mm long and 1.87–2.87 mm wide. The carapace is dark brown and often paler anteriorly. The abdomen is pale brown with dark brown mottling.

The female's legs show specific proportional measurements, with the first pair of legs being the longest. The chelicerae bear three promarginal teeth and 2–3 retromarginal teeth.

=== Male ===
The male is considerably smaller, with a body length of 2.60–3.13 mm. The carapace measures 1.36–1.53 mm in length and 1.08–1.23 mm in width, while the abdomen is 1.34–1.76 mm long and 1.13–1.44 mm wide. The male's carapace is dark brown, and the abdomen shows variable coloration patterns, ranging from pale brown mottled with dark brown to blackish brown with paired white spots.

The male possesses distinctive pedipalps with a median apophysis featuring a large triangular appendix. The embolus is filiform and wrapped in an edge of conductor.

== Taxonomy ==
The species was originally described as Epeira mulmeinensis by Thorell in 1887. It was later transferred to the genus Cyclosa by Eugène Simon in 1909. The species Argyrodes longispinus Saitō, 1933 was synonymized with C. mulmeinensis by Tanikawa in 1963.

The species bears resemblance to Cyclosa vallata (Keyserling, 1886), and detailed comparative studies have been conducted to distinguish between these closely related species.
