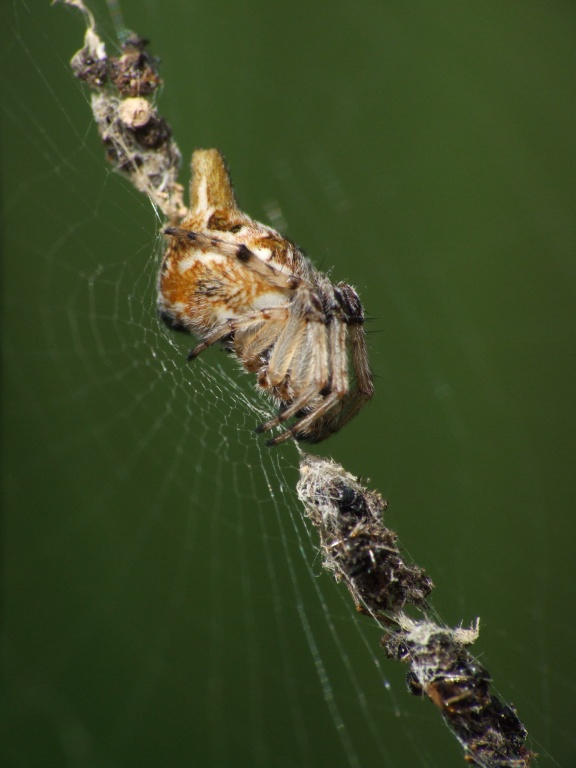

Scientific classification
- Kingdom: Animalia
- Phylum: Arthropoda
- Subphylum: Chelicerata
- Class: Arachnida
- Order: Araneae
- Infraorder: Araneomorphae
- Family: Araneidae
- Genus: Cyclosa
- Species: C. sierrae

Binomial name
- Cyclosa sierrae Simon, 1870

= Cyclosa sierrae =

Species of spider

Cyclosa sierrae is an orb-weaver spider species found in Europe to Georgia.
