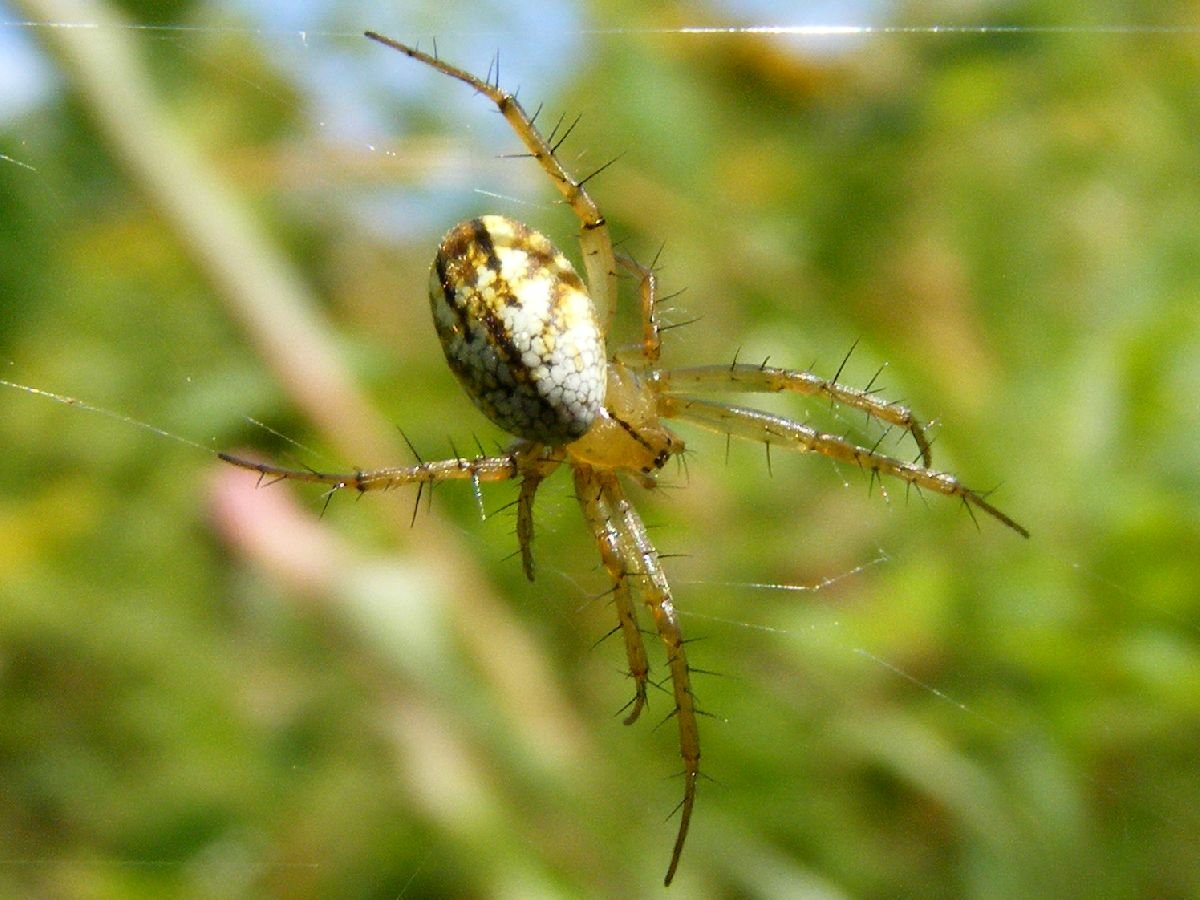

Scientific classification
- Domain: Eukaryota
- Kingdom: Animalia
- Phylum: Arthropoda
- Subphylum: Chelicerata
- Class: Arachnida
- Order: Araneae
- Infraorder: Araneomorphae
- Family: Araneidae
- Genus: Mangora
- Species: M. gibberosa

Binomial name
- Mangora gibberosa (Hentz, 1847)

= Mangora gibberosa =

Species of spider

Mangora gibberosa is a species of spider in the family Araneidae, found in North America. It is commonly misidentified as Cyclosa turbinata due to its similar appearance and orb-style webs.
