= Cyclosa longicauda =

Scientific classification
- Kingdom: Animalia
- Phylum: Arthropoda
- Subphylum: Chelicerata
- Class: Arachnida
- Order: Araneae
- Infraorder: Araneomorphae
- Family: Araneidae
- Genus: Cyclosa
- Species: C. longicauda

Binomial name
- Cyclosa longicauda (Taczanowski, 1878)

Species of spider

Cyclosa longicauda is a species of spider in the orb-weaver family Araneidae, found from Colombia to Argentina.

This Neotropical species has been formally documented in Peru to construct an elaborate, non-linear stabilimentum from detritus and silk that visually mimics a larger spider. This specific "decoy spider" behavior is hypothesized to be an advanced defense mechanism against visual predators.
