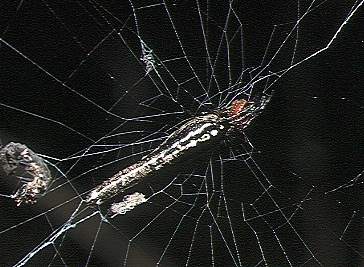
- C. bifida from Australia

Scientific classification
- Kingdom: Animalia
- Phylum: Arthropoda
- Subphylum: Chelicerata
- Class: Arachnida
- Order: Araneae
- Infraorder: Araneomorphae
- Family: Araneidae
- Genus: Cyclosa
- Species: C. bifida

Binomial name
- Cyclosa bifida (Doleschall, 1859)

Synonyms
- Epeira bifida Doleschall, 1859; Epeira macrura Thorell, 1877; Cyclosa macrura (Thorell, 1877)

= Cyclosa bifida =

Long-bellied Cyclosa Spider

Species of orb weaver spider

Cyclosa bifida is a species of orb weaver spider in the family Araneidae. It has a wide distribution across South and Southeast Asia, ranging from India to the Philippines and Indonesia, including New Guinea.

== Taxonomy ==
The species was first described by Carl Ludwig Doleschall in 1859 as Epeira bifida. It was later transferred to the genus Cyclosa by Eugène Simon in 1895. The species Epeira macrura, described by Tamerlan Thorell in 1877, was later recognized as a synonym of C. bifida by Thomas Workman in 1896.

== Distribution ==
C. bifida has been recorded from a wide range of locations across Asia. It is found throughout India, including the Khasi Hills and Jaintia Hills of Assam, the Dooars region of West Bengal, and various other states. The species extends eastward through Southeast Asia, with confirmed records from Thailand, Laos, the Philippines, and Indonesia, including New Guinea.

== Description ==
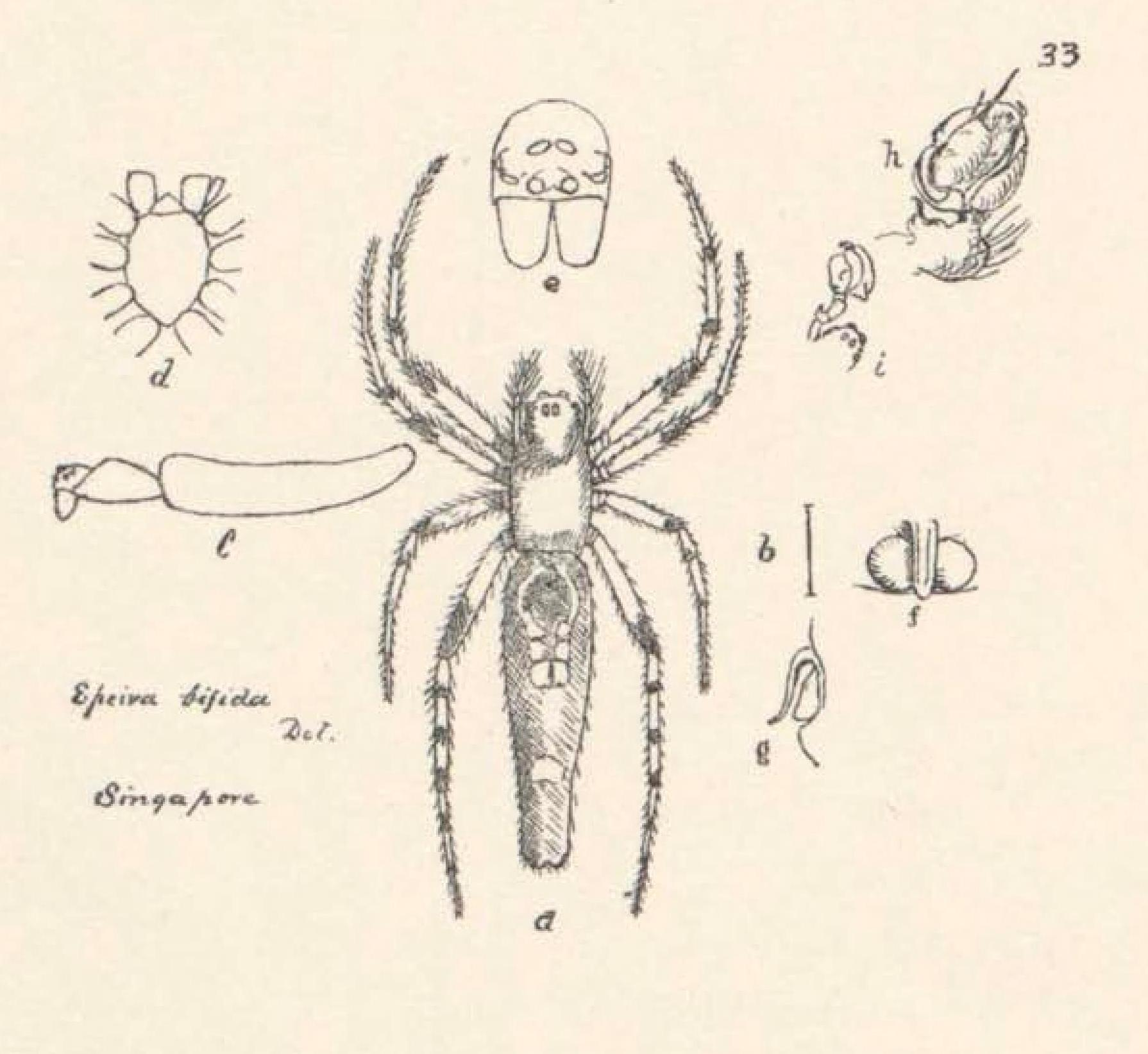
Original drawing by Workman (1896)

C. bifida exhibits pronounced sexual dimorphism. Females are considerably larger, with a total body length of 11 mm. The cephalothorax measures 2.7 mm in length. The abdomen is 8.5 mm long with a maximum breadth of 3 mm. The legs show the typical proportions for the genus.

Males are much smaller, with a total body length of 3.75 mm. The cephalothorax measures about 1.75 mm in length with a breadth of more than 1 mm. The abdomen is less than 2 mm long with a breadth of 1.2 mm.

== Habitat and behavior ==
According to historical observations from Amboina (modern-day Ambon Island), C. bifida constructs large regular webs in dark places near buildings. The spider positions itself in the middle of its web and secures it with a flat angular cocoon. In Singapore, webs were found to be perpendicular and measured 5 to 7 inches in diameter, with specific structural characteristics including 40-60 rays, 7-11 turns in the inner spiral, and 40-50 turns in the outer spiral. The spider typically does not position itself at the center of the web but rather sideways, sometimes with a leaf attached to the web as camouflage.
