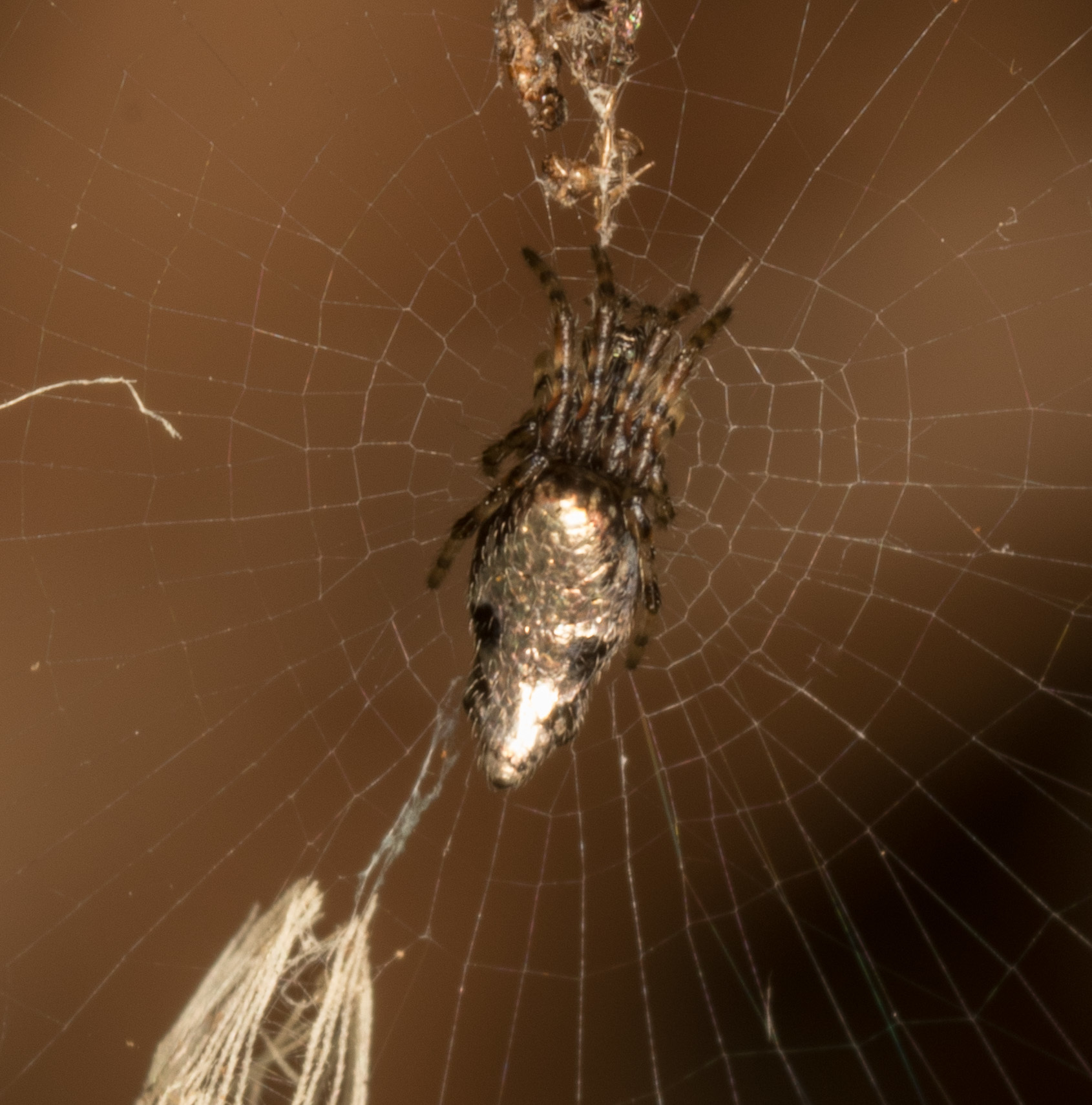
- female from Hong Kong

Scientific classification
- Kingdom: Animalia
- Phylum: Arthropoda
- Subphylum: Chelicerata
- Class: Arachnida
- Order: Araneae
- Infraorder: Araneomorphae
- Family: Araneidae
- Genus: Cyclosa
- Species: C. argentata

Binomial name
- Cyclosa argentata Tanikawa & Ono, 1993

= Cyclosa argentata =

Species of spider

Cyclosa argentata is a species of spider in the family Araneidae (orb weavers). It was first described from Taiwan.

== Distribution ==
C. argentata has been recorded from Taiwan, where the holotype was collected from Kueishan at 120 m elevation in Ilan Hsien. There are observations from Hong Kong and up to Shanghai.

== Description ==
Cyclosa argentata is a small orb weaver with distinctive coloration and morphological features. The species exhibits sexual size dimorphism, with measurements based on the female holotype.

The body length of the holotype female measures 7.20 mm, with a carapace length of 1.84 mm and width of 1.46 mm. The abdomen measures 5.27 mm in length and 2.27 mm in width. The carapace is pale brown with a dark brown head region, while the thorax is marginated with dark brown markings. The abdomen appears silvery with distinctive black markings.

The species can be distinguished from the similar Cyclosa ginnaga by differences in the shape of the epigyne.

== Etymology ==
The specific name argentata is derived from the silvery coloration of the abdomen.
