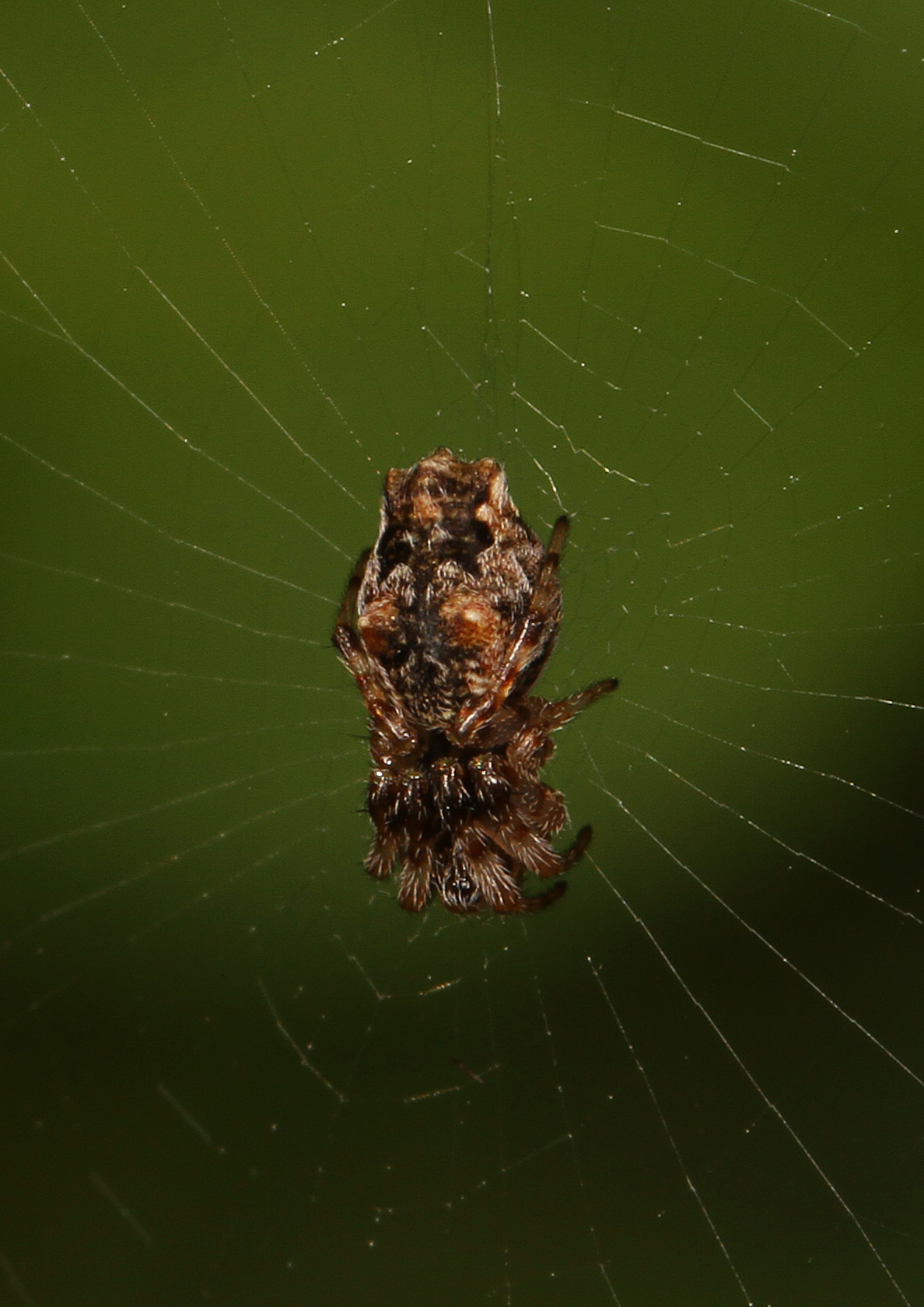

Scientific classification
- Domain: Eukaryota
- Kingdom: Animalia
- Phylum: Arthropoda
- Subphylum: Chelicerata
- Class: Arachnida
- Order: Araneae
- Infraorder: Araneomorphae
- Family: Araneidae
- Genus: Cyclosa
- Species: C. walckenaeri

Binomial name
- Cyclosa walckenaeri (O. P.-Cambridge, 1889)

= Cyclosa walckenaeri =

Species of spider

Cyclosa walckenaeri is a species of orb weaver in the spider family Araneidae. It is found in a range from the United States to Guyana and the Caribbean Sea.
