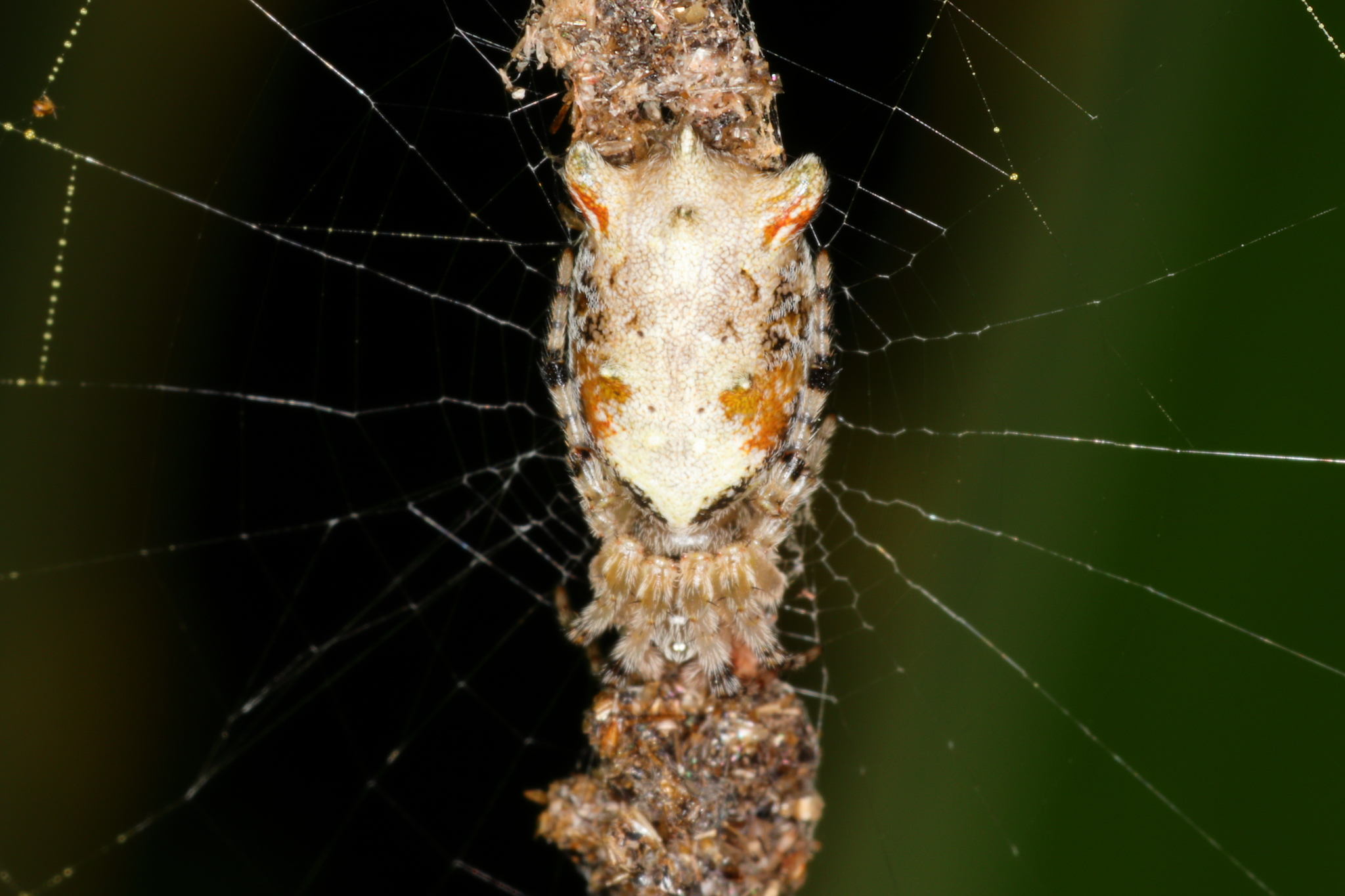
- female from Brazil

Scientific classification
- Kingdom: Animalia
- Phylum: Arthropoda
- Subphylum: Chelicerata
- Class: Arachnida
- Order: Araneae
- Infraorder: Araneomorphae
- Family: Araneidae
- Genus: Cyclosa
- Species: C. diversa

Binomial name
- Cyclosa diversa (O. Pickard-Cambridge, 1894)

Synonyms
- Turckheimia diversa O. Pickard-Cambridge, 1894; Cyclosa brevis Bryant, 1940

= Cyclosa diversa =

Species of spider

Cyclosa diversa is a species of orb weaver spider in the family Araneidae. It has a widespread distribution from Mexico to Argentina and the Greater Antilles.

== Taxonomy ==
The species was originally described as Turckheimia diversa by Octavius Pickard-Cambridge in 1894 based on a female specimen from Teapa, Tabasco, Mexico. It was later transferred to the genus Cyclosa by Frederick Octavius Pickard-Cambridge in 1904. The male was first described by Elizabeth Bryant in 1940 as Cyclosa brevis from Cuba, but this was later recognized as a junior synonym by Herbert Walter Levi in 1999.

The association of males and females was determined through a distinctive morphological feature: the long tooth of the male palpal conductor breaks off and remains embedded in the female's epigynum during mating.

== Distribution ==
C. diversa is widely distributed across the Neotropics, ranging from Mexico through Central America and the Caribbean to Argentina. Specific locations include Mexico (San Luis Potosí, Veracruz, Oaxaca, Chiapas), Honduras, El Salvador, Costa Rica, Colombia, Peru, Brazil, Cuba, and Argentina.

== Habitat ==
The species has been collected from various habitats including cloud forests in Colombia and through fogging of forest canopy in the Tambopata National Reserve, Peru. Unlike many orb weavers that use white silk, C. diversa constructs its webs using golden silk.

== Description ==
=== Female ===
The female has a brown carapace that grades into a yellowish cephalic region. The abdomen is black on the underside with a pair of white patches, while the upper surface is brown with distinctive tubercles arranged in pairs. The abdomen features an anterior pair of tubercles, a posterior pair, and two median posterior tubercles. Total body length ranges from 4.3 to 11.5 mm, with considerable variation in size.

The epigyne has a distinctive club-shaped scape with depressions at its base, and openings that are separated from the lateral margin by about one-quarter of the base width. The posterior median tubercles on the abdomen are frequently swollen, though this feature is variable.

=== Male ===
Males are considerably smaller than females, with total body length ranging from 2.0 to 4.3 mm. The carapace is dark brown grading to yellowish in the cephalic region, and the sternum is brown. The abdomen is white with black markings and has four indistinct tubercles, with only the posterior median tubercle being distinct.

The male can be distinguished from other Cyclosa species by its long palpal conductor tooth, which frequently breaks off and remains embedded in the female's epigyne after mating. Unlike the related C. bifurcata, the conductor in C. diversa does not project beyond the bulb.
