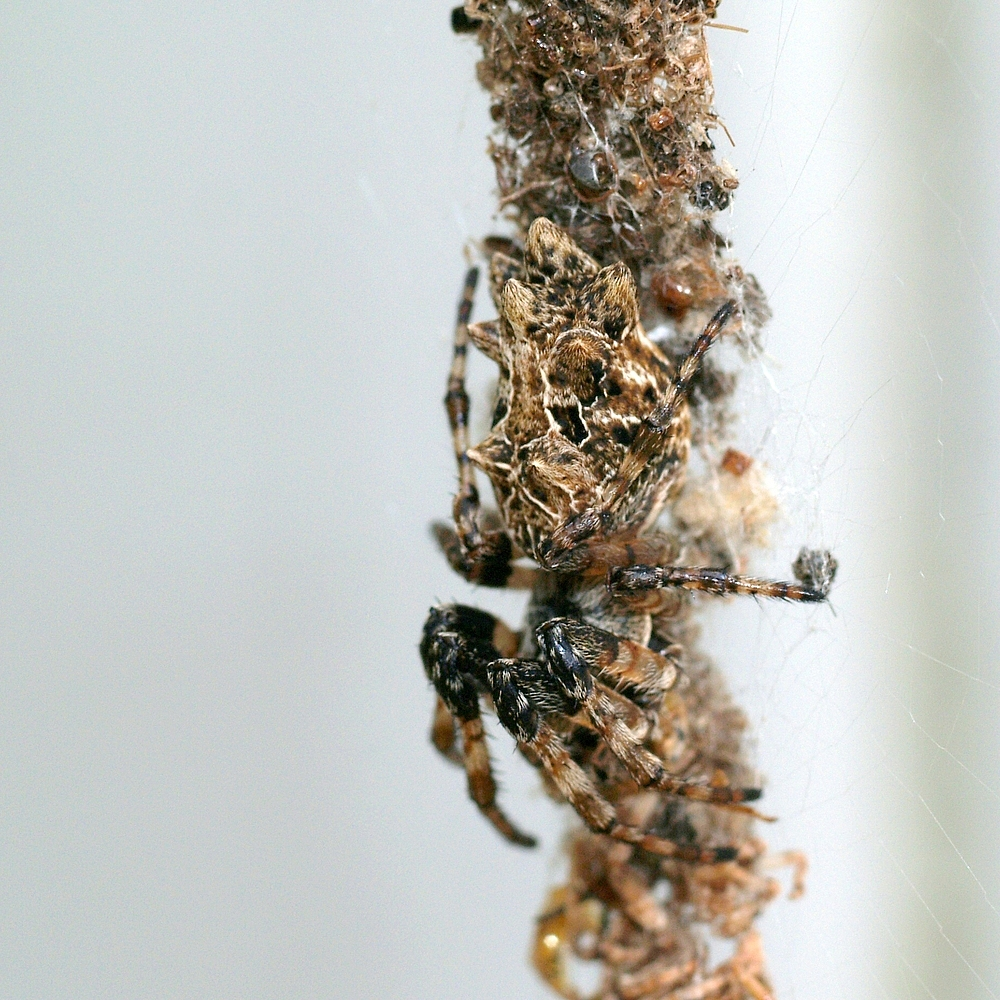
- Camouflaged Cyclosa octotuberculata
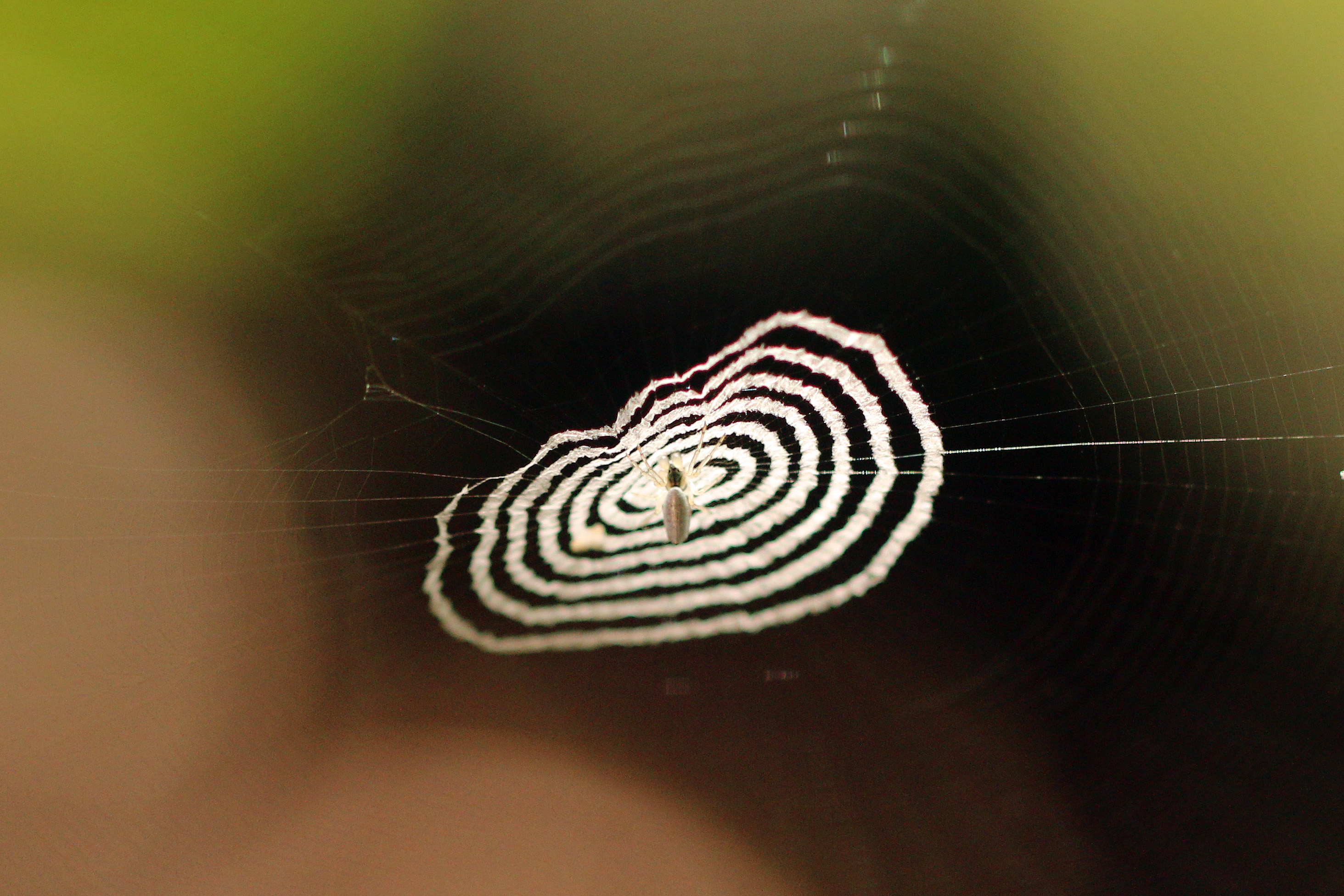
- Cyclosa insulana

Scientific classification
- Kingdom: Animalia
- Phylum: Arthropoda
- Subphylum: Chelicerata
- Class: Arachnida
- Order: Araneae
- Infraorder: Araneomorphae
- Family: Araneidae
- Genus: Cyclosa; Menge, 1866

Type species
- C. conica (Pallas, 1772)

Species
- 180, see text

= Cyclosa =

Genus of spiders

Cyclosa, also called trashline orbweavers, is a genus of orb-weaver spiders first described by Anton Menge in 1866. Widely distributed worldwide, spiders of the genus Cyclosa build relatively small orb webs with a web decoration. The web decoration in Cyclosa spiders is often linear and includes prey remains and other debris, which probably serve to camouflage the spider. However, some tropical species, including C. longicauda in Peru, construct highly complex, non-linear stabilimenta that resemble the silhouette of a much larger orb-weaving spider. This specific decoy strategy is hypothesized to serve as an advanced anti-predator defense by visual mimicry. The name "Cyclosa" comes from Greek 'to move in a circle', referring to how it spins its web.

While most orb-web spiders face downwards in their web when waiting for prey, some Cyclosa species (e.g. C. ginnaga and C. argenteoalba) face upwards.

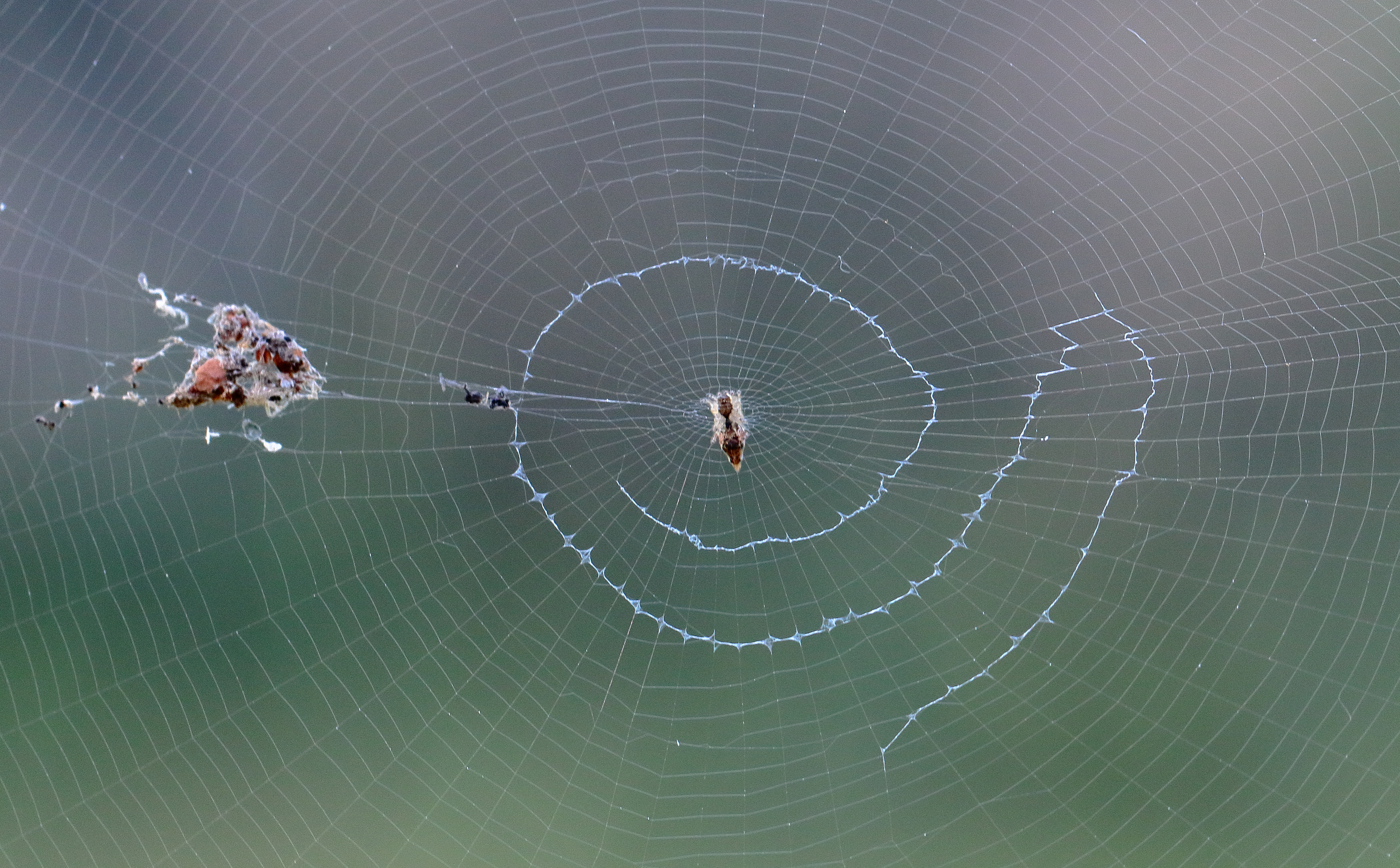
Cyclosa sp. in north Queensland, Australia

== Species ==
As of September 2025, this genus includes 178 species and two subspecies:

- Cyclosa alayoni Levi, 1999 – Cuba, Puerto Rico
- Cyclosa alba Tanikawa, 1992 – Japan
- Cyclosa albisternis Simon, 1888 – India, (mainland, Andaman Is.), Introduced to Hawaii
- Cyclosa albopunctata Kulczyński, 1901 – Eritrea, Indonesia (New Guinea), New Caledonia
- Cyclosa algerica Simon, 1885 – Portugal, Spain, France, Algeria, Tunisia, Italy (Sicily), Greece, Turkey, Azerbaijan, Iran
- Cyclosa anatipes (Keyserling, 1887) – Australia (Queensland), Palau
- Cyclosa andinas Levi, 1999 – Colombia, Ecuador
- Cyclosa angusta Tanikawa, 1992 – Japan
- Cyclosa anjing Mi, Wang & Li, 2024 – China
- Cyclosa apoblepta (Rainbow, 1916) – Australia (Queensland)
- Cyclosa argentaria (Rainbow, 1916) – Australia (Queensland)
- Cyclosa argentata Tanikawa & Ono, 1993 – Taiwan
- Cyclosa argenteoalba Bösenberg & Strand, 1906 – Japan, Korea, China, Taiwan, Russia, (Far East)
- Cyclosa atrata Bösenberg & Strand, 1906 – China, Korea, Japan, Russia, (Far East)
- Cyclosa baakea Barrion & Litsinger, 1995 – Philippines
- Cyclosa bacilliformis Simon, 1908 – Australia (Western Australia)
- Cyclosa banawensis Barrion & Litsinger, 1995 – Philippines
- Cyclosa berlandi Levi, 1999 – United States, Hispaniola, Ecuador
- Cyclosa bianchoria Yin, Wang, Xie & Peng, 1990 – China
- Cyclosa bifida (Doleschall, 1859) – India, Philippines and Indonesia (New Guinea)
- Cyclosa bifurcata (Walckenaer, 1841) – Costa Rica, Hispaniola, Argentina
- Cyclosa bihamata F. Zhang, M. S. Zhang & Zhu, 2010 – China
- Cyclosa bilobata Sen, Saha & Raychaudhuri, 2012 – India
- Cyclosa bituberculata Biswas & Raychaudhuri, 1998 – Bangladesh
- Cyclosa bulla Tanikawa & Petcharad, 2018 – Thailand, Singapore, Brunei
- Cyclosa bulleri (Thorell, 1881) – Papua New Guinea
- Cyclosa cajamarca Levi, 1999 – Peru
- Cyclosa caligata (Thorell, 1890) – Indonesia (Sumatra)
- Cyclosa camargoi Levi, 1999 – Brazil
- Cyclosa camelodes (Thorell, 1878) – Seychelles, Indonesia (New Guinea)
- Cyclosa caroli (Hentz, 1850) – United States, Caribbean, Bolivia
- Cyclosa centrifaciens Hingston, 1927 – Myanmar
- Cyclosa centrodes (Thorell, 1887) – India, Singapore
- Cyclosa cephalodina Song & Liu, 1996 – China
- Cyclosa chichawatniensis Mukhtar & Mushtaq, 2005 – Pakistan
- Cyclosa circumlucens Simon, 1907 – Guinea-Bissau, São Tomé and Príncipe
- Cyclosa concolor Caporiacco, 1933 – Libya
- Cyclosa confraga (Thorell, 1893) – Pakistan, India, Bangladesh, Singapore, Vietnam
- Cyclosa confusa Bösenberg & Strand, 1906 – China, Korea, Taiwan, Japan
- Cyclosa conica (Pallas, 1772) – North America, Europe, Turkey, Caucasus, Russia (Europe to Far East), Iran, Central Asia, China. Introduced to South Africa (type species)
- Cyclosa conigera F. O. Pickard-Cambridge, 1904 – Mexico, Honduras
- Cyclosa coylei Levi, 1999 – Mexico, Guatemala
- Cyclosa cucurbitoria (Yin, Wang, Xie & Peng, 1990) – China, Thailand
- Cyclosa cucurbitula Simon, 1900 – Hawaii
- Cyclosa curiraba Levi, 1999 – Bolivia
- Cyclosa cylindrata Yin, Zhu & Wang, 1995 – China
- Cyclosa cylindrifaciens Hingston, 1927 – Myanmar
- Cyclosa damingensis Xie, Yin & Kim, 1995 – China
- Cyclosa daodai Mi, Wang & Li, 2024 – China
- Cyclosa deserticola Levy, 1998 – Egypt, Israel
- Cyclosa dianasilvae Levi, 1999 – Ecuador, Peru
- Cyclosa diversa (O. Pickard-Cambridge, 1894) – Mexico, Cuba, Argentina
- Cyclosa dives Simon, 1877 – China, Philippines
- Cyclosa donking Levi, 1999 – Bolivia
- Cyclosa dosbukolea Barrion & Litsinger, 1995 – Philippines
- Cyclosa durango Levi, 1999 – Mexico
- Cyclosa elongata Biswas & Raychaudhuri, 1998 – Bangladesh
- Cyclosa espumoso Levi, 1999 – Brazil
- Cyclosa fililineata Hingston, 1932 – Panama, Argentina
- Cyclosa formosa Karsch, 1879 – West Africa
- Cyclosa formosana Tanikawa & Ono, 1993 – Taiwan
- Cyclosa ginnaga Yaginuma, 1959 – Russia (Far East), Korea, Japan, China, Taiwan
- Cyclosa gossypiata Keswani, 2013 – India
- Cyclosa groppalii Pesarini, 1998 – Spain (incl. Balearic Is.), Greece (Crete)
- Cyclosa gulinensis Xie, Yin & Kim, 1995 – China
- Cyclosa haiti Levi, 1999 – Hispaniola, Jamaica, Puerto Rico (Mona Is.)
- Cyclosa hamulata Tanikawa, 1992 – Russia (Far East), Japan
- Cyclosa hexatuberculata Tikader, 1982 – Pakistan, India
- Cyclosa huila Levi, 1999 – Colombia
- Cyclosa imias Levi, 1999 – Cuba
- Cyclosa inca Levi, 1999 – Colombia, Peru, Argentina
- Cyclosa informis Yin, Zhu & Wang, 1995 – China
- Cyclosa insulana (Costa, 1834) – Mediterranean, Japan, India, Papua New Guinea, Australia, St. Helena, South Africa, Eswatini
- Cyclosa ipilea Barrion & Litsinger, 1995 – Philippines
- Cyclosa jalapa Levi, 1999 – Mexico
- Cyclosa japonica Bösenberg & Strand, 1906 – Russia (Far East), China, Korea, Taiwan, Japan
- Cyclosa jose Levi, 1999 – Costa Rica
- Cyclosa kashmirica Caporiacco, 1934 – Pakistan (Karakorum)
- Cyclosa kibonotensis Tullgren, 1910 – Central, East Africa, Seychelles
- Cyclosa koi Tanikawa & Ono, 1993 – Taiwan
- Cyclosa krusa Barrion & Litsinger, 1995 – Pakistan, India, Philippines
- Cyclosa kumadai Tanikawa, 1992 – Russia (Far East), Korea, Japan
- Cyclosa laticauda Bösenberg & Strand, 1906 – China, Korea, Taiwan, Japan
- Cyclosa lawrencei Caporiacco, 1949 – Kenya
- Cyclosa libertad Levi, 1999 – Ecuador, Peru
- Cyclosa lichensis (Rainbow, 1916) – Australia (Queensland)
- Cyclosa litoralis (L. Koch, 1867) – Vanuatu, Samoa, Fiji, Tahiti
- Cyclosa longicauda (Taczanowski, 1878) – Colombia, Peru, Argentina
- Cyclosa longquan Mi, Wang & Li, 2024 – China
- Cyclosa machadinho Levi, 1999 – Brazil, Argentina
- Cyclosa maderiana Kulczyński, 1899 – Madeira, Canary Islands
- Cyclosa maritima Tanikawa, 1992 – Japan
- Cyclosa mavaca Levi, 1999 – Colombia, Venezuela
- Cyclosa meruensis Tullgren, 1910 – Tanzania
- Cyclosa micula (Thorell, 1893) – India, Singapore
- Cyclosa minora Yin, Zhu & Wang, 1995 – China
- Cyclosa mocoa Levi, 1999 – Colombia
- Cyclosa mohini Dyal, 1935 – Pakistan
- Cyclosa monteverde Levi, 1999 – Costa Rica, Panama
- Cyclosa monticola Bösenberg & Strand, 1906 – China, Korea, Taiwan, Japan, Russia, (Far East)
- Cyclosa moonduensis Tikader, 1963 – India
- Cyclosa morretes Levi, 1999 – Brazil
- Cyclosa mulmeinensis (Thorell, 1887) – Asia (without Russia)
- Cyclosa neilensis Tikader, 1977 – India
- Cyclosa nevada Levi, 1999 – Colombia
- Cyclosa nigra Yin, Wang, Xie & Peng, 1990 – China, Vietnam
- Cyclosa nodosa (O. Pickard-Cambridge, 1889) – Guatemala, Costa Rica
- Cyclosa norihisai Tanikawa, 1992 – China, Japan
- Cyclosa oatesi (Thorell, 1892) – Myanmar (Table Is.)
- Cyclosa octotuberculata Karsch, 1879 – China, Korea, Taiwan, Japan
- Cyclosa oculata (Walckenaer, 1802) – Europe, Russia (Europe to Far East), Caucasus, Kazakhstan, Central Asia, China. Introduced to South Africa, Hawaii
- Cyclosa odateana Kishida, 1915 – Japan
- Cyclosa ojeda Levi, 1999 – Curaçao
- Cyclosa okumae Tanikawa, 1992 – Russia (Far East), Korea, Japan
- Cyclosa olivenca Levi, 1999 – Brazil
- Cyclosa olorina Simon, 1900 – Hawaii
- Cyclosa omonaga Tanikawa, 1992 – China, Korea, Taiwan, Japan
- Cyclosa onoi Tanikawa, 1992 – Russia (Far East), China, Korea, Japan
- Cyclosa oseret Levi, 1999 – Brazil
- Cyclosa otsomarka Barrion & Litsinger, 1995 – Philippines
- Cyclosa pantanal Levi, 1999 – Brazil
- Cyclosa parangmulmeinensis Barrion & Litsinger, 1995 – Philippines
- Cyclosa parangtarugoa Barrion & Litsinger, 1995 – Philippines
- Cyclosa paupercula Simon, 1893 – Malaysia (Borneo)
- Cyclosa pedropalo Levi, 1999 – Colombia
- Cyclosa pellaxoides Roewer, 1942 – Singapore
- Cyclosa pentatuberculata Yin, Zhu & Wang, 1995 – China
- Cyclosa perkinsi Simon, 1900 – Hawaii
- Cyclosa picchu Levi, 1999 – Peru
- Cyclosa pichilinque Levi, 1999 – Mexico
- Cyclosa poweri (Rainbow, 1916) – Australia (New South Wales)
- Cyclosa pseudoculata Schenkel, 1936 – China
- Cyclosa psylla (Thorell, 1887) – Myanmar, Japan
- Cyclosa punctata Keyserling, 1879 – Brazil
- Cyclosa punjabiensis Ghafoor & Beg, 2002 – Pakistan
- Cyclosa purnai Keswani, 2013 – India
- Cyclosa pusilla Simon, 1880 – New Caledonia
- Cyclosa quinqueguttata (Thorell, 1881) – India, Bhutan, Myanmar, China, Taiwan
- Cyclosa reniformis Zhu, Lian & Chen, 2006 – China
- Cyclosa rostrata Zhou & Zhang, 2017 – China
- Cyclosa rubronigra Caporiacco, 1947 – Costa Rica, Brazil
- Cyclosa sachikoae Tanikawa, 1992 – Japan, China
- Cyclosa saismarka Barrion & Litsinger, 1995 – Pakistan, Philippines
- Cyclosa sanctibenedicti (Vinson, 1863) – Réunion
- Cyclosa santafe Levi, 1999 – Colombia
- Cyclosa sedeculata Karsch, 1879 – Russia (Far East), China, Korea, Japan
- Cyclosa senticauda Zhu & Wang, 1994 – China
- Cyclosa serena Levi, 1999 – Chile, Argentina
- Cyclosa seriata (Thorell, 1881) – Indonesia (Java)
- Cyclosa shinoharai Tanikawa & Ono, 1993 – Taiwan
- Cyclosa sierrae Simon, 1870 – Southern Europe, Hungary, Ukraine, Turkey, Caucasus, Iran
- Cyclosa simoni Tikader, 1982 – India
- Cyclosa simplicicauda Simon, 1900 – Hawaii
  - C. s. rufescens Simon, 1900 – Hawaii
- Cyclosa spirifera Simon, 1889 – Pakistan, India
- Cyclosa tamanaco Levi, 1999 – Trinidad
- Cyclosa tapetifaciens Hingston, 1932 – Panama, Argentina
- Cyclosa tardipes (Thorell, 1895) – Myanmar
  - C. t. ignava (Thorell, 1895) – Myanmar
- Cyclosa tauraai Berland, 1933 – French Polynesia (Marquesas Is., Society Is.)
- Cyclosa teresa Levi, 1999 – Brazil
- Cyclosa tricolor (Leardi, 1902) – Philippines
- Cyclosa trilobata (Urquhart, 1885) – Australia, Tasmania, New Zealand
- Cyclosa tripartita Tullgren, 1910 – Tanzania
- Cyclosa triquetra Simon, 1895 – Mexico, Caribbean, Peru
- Cyclosa tropica Biswas & Raychaudhuri, 1998 – Bangladesh
- Cyclosa tuberascens Simon, 1906 – India
- Cyclosa turbinata (Walckenaer, 1841) – United States, Panama, West Indies, Galapagos. Introduced to Hawaii
- Cyclosa turvo Levi, 1999 – Brazil
- Cyclosa vallata (Keyserling, 1886) – China, Korea, Taiwan, Japan, Papua New Guinea, Australia (Queensland)
- Cyclosa vankhedensis Dhande, Bodkhe & Ahmad, 2017 – India
- Cyclosa vicente Levi, 1999 – Colombia, Brazil, Argentina
- Cyclosa vieirae Levi, 1999 – Peru, Brazil
- Cyclosa walckenaeri (O. Pickard-Cambridge, 1889) – United States, Guyana, Caribbean
- Cyclosa woyangchuan F. Zhang, M. S. Zhang & Zhu, 2010 – China
- Cyclosa xanthomelas Simon, 1900 – Hawaii
- Cyclosa xingqing Mi, Wang & Li, 2024 – China
- Cyclosa yaginumai Biswas & Raychaudhuri, 1998 – Bangladesh
- Cyclosa zhangmuensis Hu & Li, 1987 – China
- Cyclosa zhui Zhou & Zhang, 2017 – China
