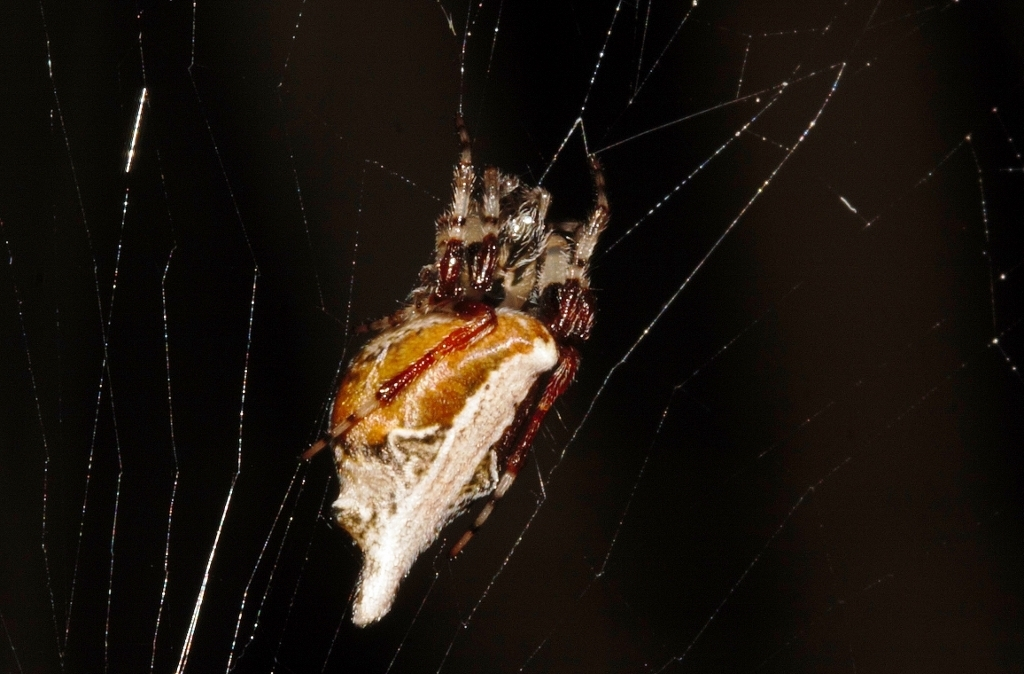
- female from Zimbabwe
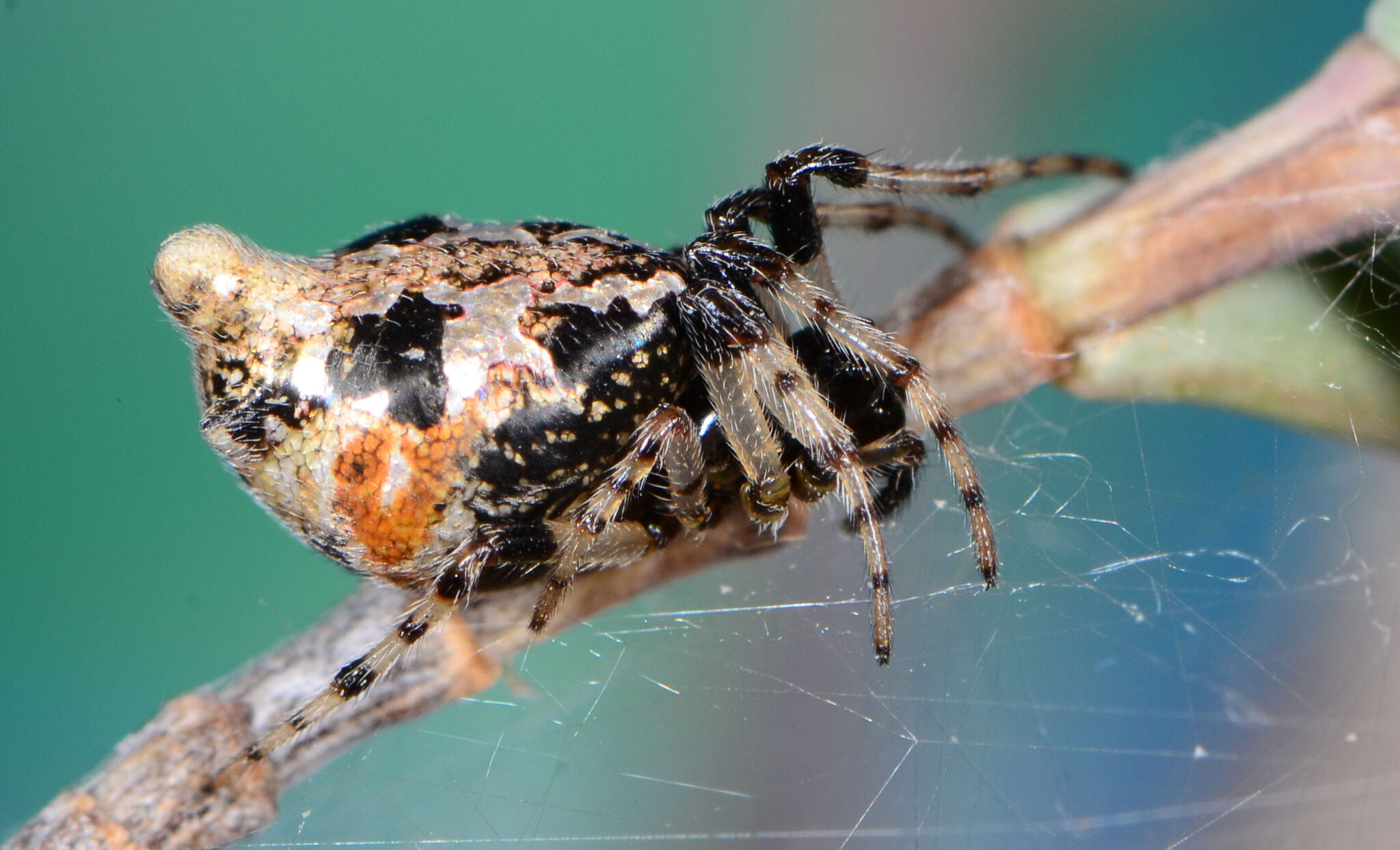

Scientific classification
- Kingdom: Animalia
- Phylum: Arthropoda
- Subphylum: Chelicerata
- Class: Arachnida
- Order: Araneae
- Infraorder: Araneomorphae
- Family: Araneidae
- Genus: Cyclosa
- Species: C. insulana

Binomial name
- Cyclosa insulana (Costa, 1834)

Synonyms
- Epeira insulana Costa, 1834; Epeira anseripes Walckenaer, 1841; Epeira trituberculata Lucas, 1846; Epeira moesta Blackwall, 1865; Cyrtophora argentea Ausserer, 1871; Cyrtophora melanura Simon, 1877; Cyclosa propinqua Simon, 1882; Cyrtophora interalbicans Bösenberg & Lenz, 1895

= Cyclosa insulana =

Common Garbage-Line Web Spider

Species of orb-weaver spider

Cyclosa insulana is a species of orb-weaver spider in the family Araneidae. Its distribution ranges from the Mediterranean region eastward to Japan, India to Papua New Guinea, Australia, and parts of Africa including St. Helena, South Africa, and Eswatini.

== Distribution ==
C. insulana is widely distributed across the warm and tropical regions of the Old World, with records spanning from the Mediterranean to the Philippines and Australia. In the Seychelles, it has been recorded from Mahé and Silhouette Island, though some specimens from this region may represent other closely related species.

== Habitat and ecology ==
The species inhabits multiple biomes at altitudes ranging from 4 to 1593 m above sea level. They make a complete vertical, closely woven orb web in vegetation, about one metre above the ground. The distinguishing character of the web is the vertical stabilimentum in line with the hub. The spider strings together dead bodies of prey and other debris on this stabilimentum. The spider hides in this debris as a defence against predators. This common species is frequently found in sweep net and beating samples, and has been sampled from all the floral biomes. The species has been recorded from crops such as avocado, citrus orchards and tomato fields.

== Description ==
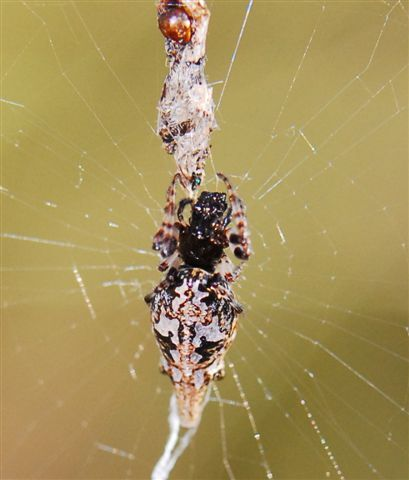
female

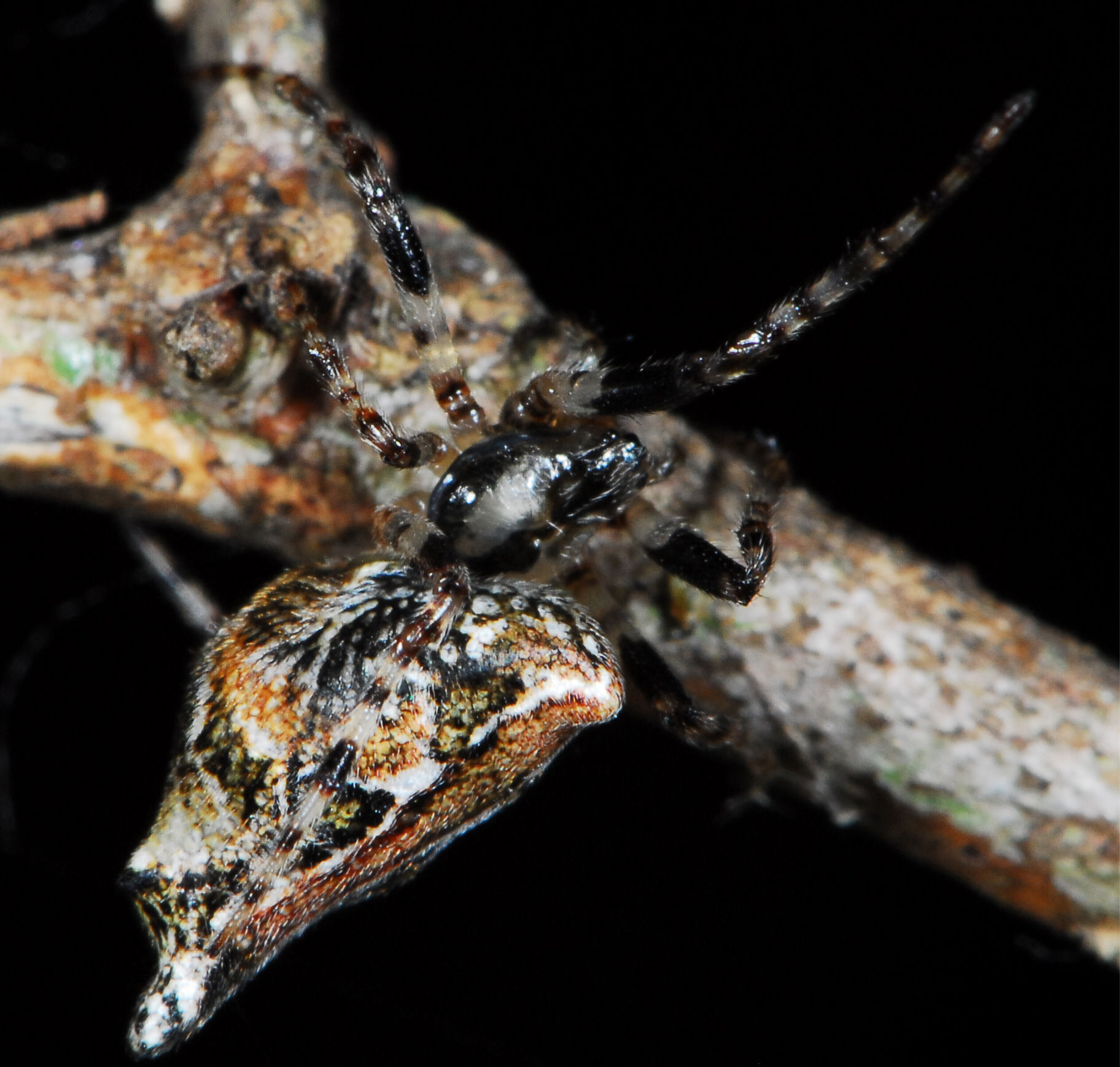
female

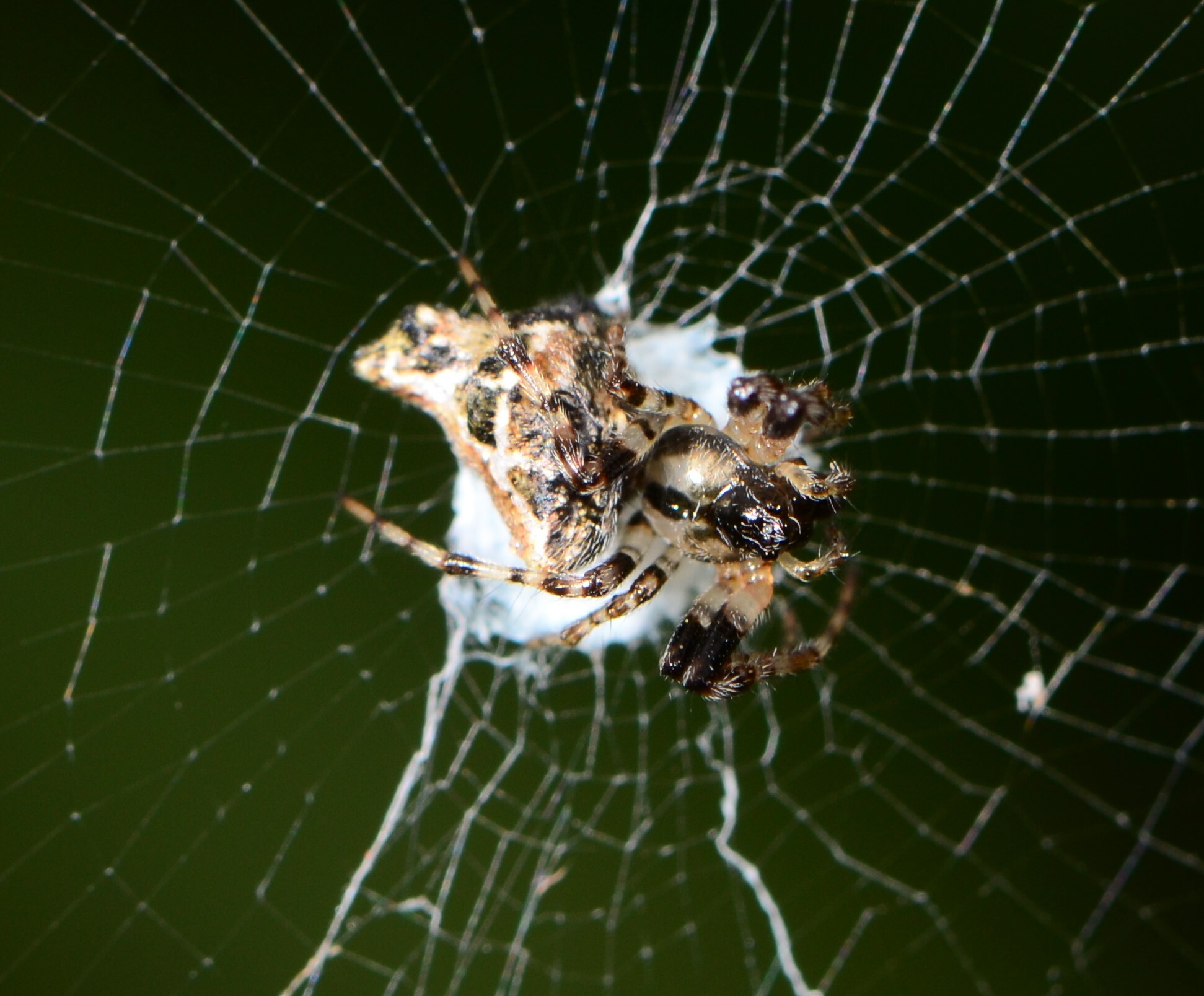
female

Females of C. insulana can be distinguished by having a broad scapus (the basal part of the spinneret) in the anterior region. Males are identified by the distinctive shape of their pedipalps.

== Etymology ==
The specific epithet "insulana" is derived from the Latin "insula" meaning "island," referring to the insular habitat where the species was first discovered on the Italian islands of Ischia and Procida.

== Taxonomy ==
Cyclosa insulana was first described by Italian naturalist Oronzio Gabriele Costa in 1834 as Epeira insulana. The species has a complex taxonomic history with numerous synonyms, reflecting its wide distribution and the historical tendency to describe the same species multiple times from different locations.

== Conservation ==
Cyclosa insulana is listed as Least Concern by the South African National Biodiversity Institute due to its wide geographical range. The species is protected in more than 30 protected areas including Addo Elephant National Park, Mountain Zebra National Park, Mkambathi Nature Reserve, and De Hoop Nature Reserve.
