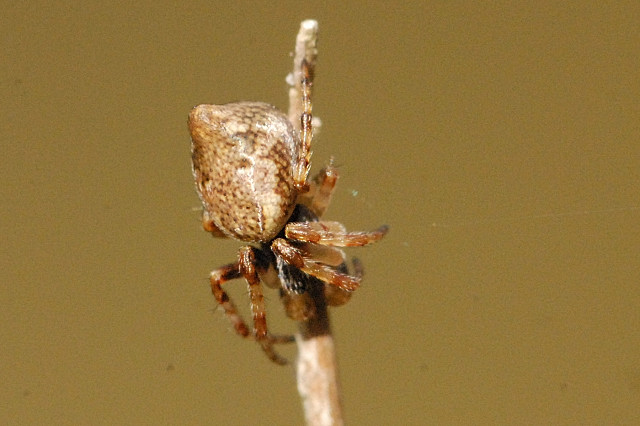
- Female spiderling

Conservation status
- Secure (NatureServe)

Scientific classification
- Kingdom: Animalia
- Phylum: Arthropoda
- Subphylum: Chelicerata
- Class: Arachnida
- Order: Araneae
- Infraorder: Araneomorphae
- Family: Araneidae
- Genus: Cyclosa
- Species: C. conica

Binomial name
- Cyclosa conica Pallas, 1772
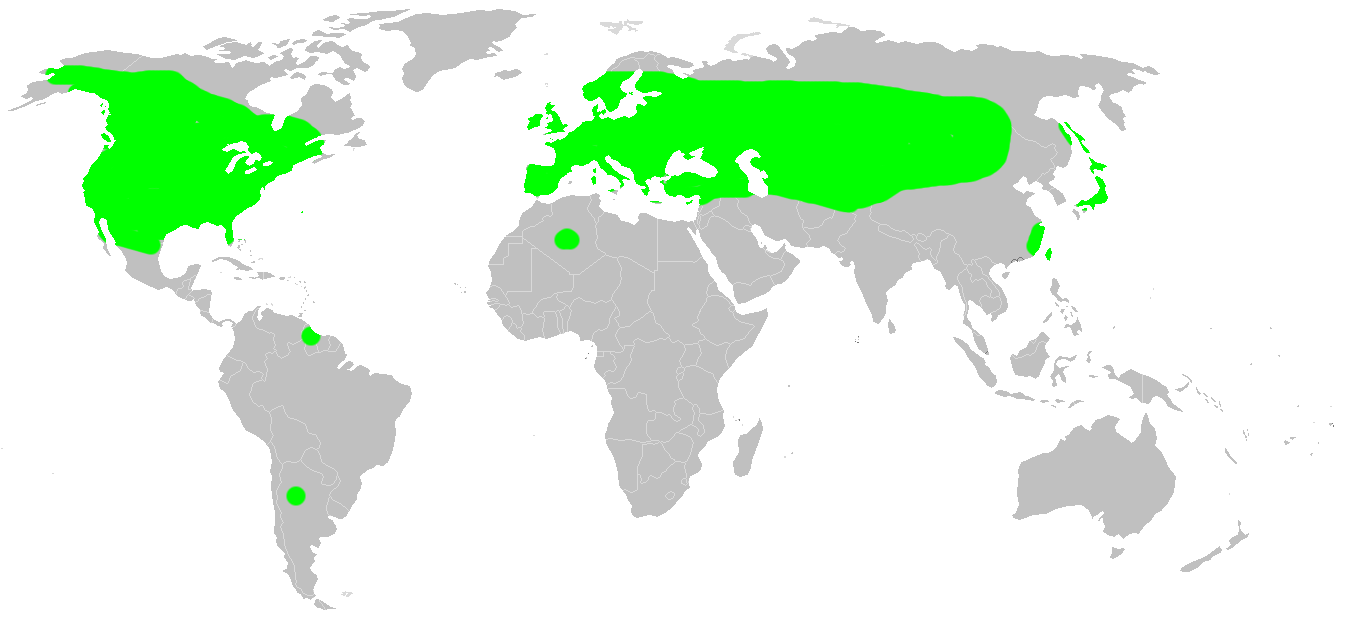

Synonyms
- Aranea conica; Aranea triquetra; Epeira conica; Singa conica; Epeira canadensis; Cyrtophora conica; Cyclosa strandjae

= Cyclosa conica =

Species of spider

Cyclosa conica is a species of orb weaver spider. It strings together the dead bodies of insects and other debris and hangs it near the center of its web. It hides on this string of debris, and its natural coloration makes it extremely difficult to see until it moves. One of its defenses against predators is to blend in with this debris and to feign death when disturbed. These spiders are small; the females range from 5.3 mm to 7.5 mm, and the males range from 3.6 mm to 4 mm.

The webs of these spiders are characterized by a vertical stripe running down the center. This stripe, or stabilimentum, is composed of dead prey and other debris and is used as a hiding place for the spider. The material in the stabilimentum may also serve as a decoy to mislead predators into attacking the debris, giving the spider time to escape.

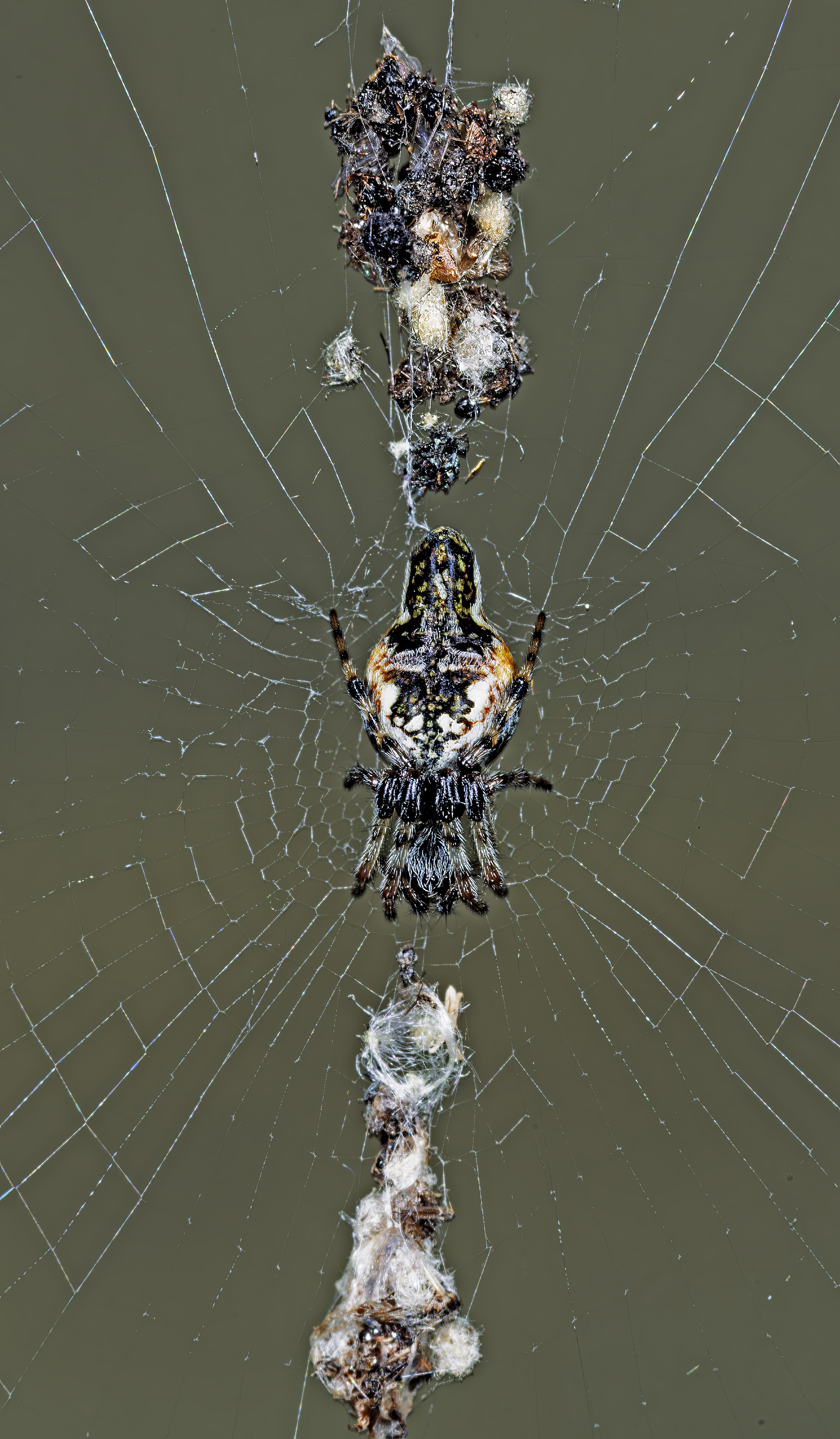
It leaves remains and debris along the stabilimentum. It stands in the center, legs folded, and thus goes unnoticed by potential predators.

== Subspecies ==
- Cyclosa conica albifoliata Strand, 1907 (France)
- Cyclosa conica defoliata Strand, 1907 (Central Europe)
- Cyclosa conica dimidiata Simon, 1929 (France)
- Cyclosa conica leucomelas Strand, 1907 (Central Europe)
- Cyclosa conica pyrenaica Strand, 1907 (France)
- Cyclosa conica zamezai Franganillo, 1909 (España)
