= Charles Walckenaer =

French civil servant and scientist

Baron Charles Walckenaer
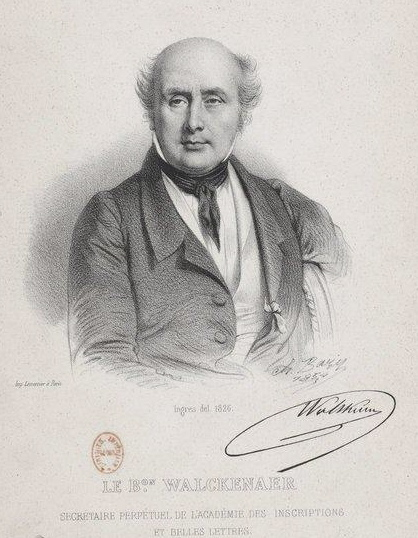
- Born: 25 December 1771; Paris
- Died: 28 April 1852 (aged 80); Paris
- Education: University of Oxford, University of Glasgow, École Nationale des Ponts et Chaussées, École polytechnique
- Known for: Biographies of La Fontaine and others
- Parents: Illegitimate son of Charles-Nicolas Duclos du Fresnoy (father); Anne Pajot de Villeperrot (mother)
- Scientific career
- Fields: Arachnology, entomology
- Institutions: Royal Library of France, Académie des Inscriptions et Belles-Lettres
- Author abbrev. (zoology): Walckenaer

Baron Charles Athanase Walckenaer (25 December 1771 – 28 April 1852) was a French civil servant, writer, man of letters, and scientist. He was a polymath and wrote extensively on geography, natural history, and literature. Major contributions included his multi-volume natural histories of arachnids and insects, some published in collaboration with others. He was made a baron in 1823.

== Biography ==
Walckenaer was born in Paris and after losing his parents at an early age he was raised by his uncle Charles-Nicolas Duclos Dufresnoy, a notary in the court of Louis XVI. His uncle's elite and educated circle made an impression on the young boy and he was sent to study at the universities of Oxford and Glasgow. Dufresnoy was guillotined in 1794 following the French Revolution for being associated with the regime. In 1793, Walckenaer was appointed head of the military transports in the Pyrenees, after which he pursued technical studies at the École Nationale des Ponts et Chaussées and the École polytechnique. He was elected member of the Institut de France in 1813, was mayor (maire) in the 5th arrondissement in Paris and secretary-general of the prefect of the Seine 1816–1825. He was made a baron in 1823. He was dismissed in 1830 from his government position and he spent his time in studies.

Walckenaer married a relative Joséphine Marie Jeanne Antoinette Marcotte de Pyn (1776-1849) in 1794.

He was a keen entomologist and arachnologist and one of the founders of the Société entomologique de France in 1832, and a "resident member" of the Société des observateurs de l'homme. He wrote the Histoire naturelle des insectes (4 vols., 1836–1847) together with Paul Gervais. He collected specimens and information on spiders from around the world and described a number of taxa. He transferred the black widow to its current genus and discovered multiple species of Cyclosa, including C. turbinata.

Walckenaer introduced the full biography according to the English model into French literature through his works Histoire de la vie et des ouvrages de la Fontaine (1820, 4th ed. 1858), Histoire de la vie et des poésies d'Horace (1840; new ed. 1858) and Mémoires touchent la vie et les écrits de Mme de Sevigné (6 volumes, 1842–1865). In the works of La Bruyère, which he published in 1845, he returned to the original text.

In 1839, he was appointed conservator for the Department of Maps at the Royal Library in Paris and in 1840, secretary for life in the Académie des Inscriptions et Belles Lettres. In the area of geography, he discovered the map of Juan de la Cosa, the oldest extant map that shows the American continent, and published Le monde maritime (4 vols., 1818), Histoire générale des voyages (21 vols., 1826–1831) and Géographie ancienne, historique et comparée des Gaules (3 vols., 1839, new ed. 1862).
