= Argyrodinae =

- Neospintharus trigonum

Scientific classification
- Kingdom: Animalia
- Phylum: Arthropoda
- Subphylum: Chelicerata
- Class: Arachnida
- Order: Araneae
- Infraorder: Araneomorphae
- Family: Theridiidae
- Subfamily: Argyrodinae

Subfamily of spiders

Argyrodinae is a subfamily comb-footed spiders known for being kleptoparasitic.

== Taxonomy ==
Argyrodinae contains the following genera:

- Deelemanella
- Argyrodella
- Faiditus
- Rhinoliparus
- Spheropistha
- Rhinocosmetus
- Neospintharus
- Argyrodes
- Ariamnes
- Rhomphaea
