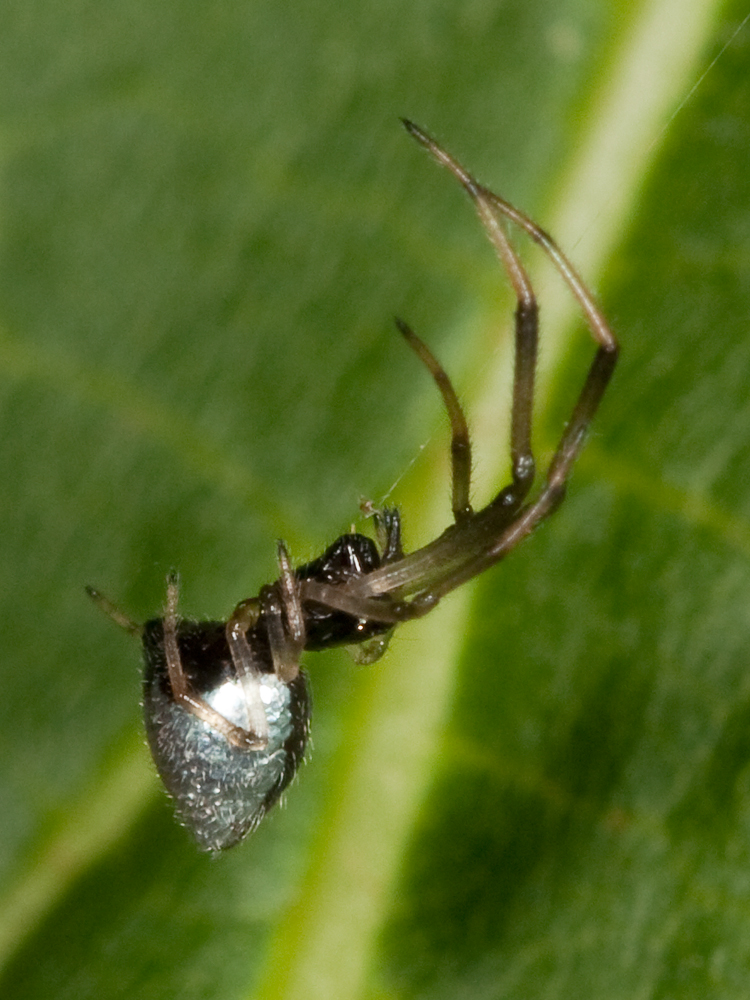
- female Argyrodes sp. from Tennessee

Scientific classification
- Kingdom: Animalia
- Phylum: Arthropoda
- Subphylum: Chelicerata
- Class: Arachnida
- Order: Araneae
- Infraorder: Araneomorphae
- Family: Theridiidae
- Subfamily: Argyrodinae
- Genus: Argyrodes; Simon, 1864

Type species
- A. argyrodes (Walckenaer, 1841)

Species
- 85, see text

Synonyms
- Argyrodina Strand, 1926; Conopistha Karsch, 1881; Microcephalus Restrepo, 1944

= Argyrodes =

Dewdrop spiders Temporal range: Neogene– Present

Genus of spiders

Argyrodes, also called dewdrop spiders, is a genus of comb-footed spiders that was first described by Eugène Louis Simon in 1864. They occur worldwide, and are best known for their kleptoparasitism. They can spin their own webs, but tend to invade and reside in their hosts' webs. This relationship can be commensal or even mutual if the dewdrop spider feeds on small trapped insects that are not eaten by the host. Some species can even prey upon the host.

The genus name is a combination of the Ancient Greek "argyros" (άργυρος), meaning "silver", and the suffix "-odes", meaning "like".

== Description ==
Most species are relatively small, and many are black with silvery markings. A. incursus has a body length of 3 to 4.5 millimetres (0.12 to 0.18 in), while A. fissifrons has a body length of about 12 millimetres (0.47 in). The body has a characteristic conical or triangle shape with a shorter third pair of legs, common in web dwelling spiders. The silver coloration of Argyrodes may be able to attract moths and other insects as it stimulates their photoreceptors and may resemble starlight.

The most striking anatomical character of Argyrodes and related other genera is a prosomatic sexual dimorphism, the cephalic part of male's cephalothorax being often strangely modified by "deformations" such as knobs, notches and sulci. During copulation they are gripped by the chelicerae of the female to contact the secretion of an underlying exocrine organ discovered and named clypeal or acronal gland by André Lopez(1974).

== Distribution ==
Most Argyrodes are found in the tropics, though fifteen species are found in the United States. A. elevatus is found in the southern US, A. nephilae in Florida and A. pluto in Maryland, Virginia, and Missouri. The latter species has been reported as far south as Chihuahua and Jamaica as well.

== Behavior ==
=== Kleptoparasitism ===
Argyrodes are kleptoparasitic spiders that live on the webs created by orb-weaver spiders. These spiders feed on the small prey items caught in the host webs that they parasitize. In some instances, Argyrodes may even feed on previously digested carcasses that remain on the web. While these spiders are well known for being kleptoparasitic, they are also arachnophagous, meaning they prey on other spiders. Argyrodes will wait for a time when the host spider is vulnerable, such as during molting, and will attack and feed on it. This is true for the host spider's offspring as well, however Argyrodes will only feed on other spiders in some instances.

It has been suggested that Argyrodes may have a mutualistic relationship with the host. The silver coloration of Argyrodes was found to attract more prey, particularly moths, to the host's web. This allows for larger prey items to be attracted for the host spider while Argyrodes is able to consume the smaller unwanted prey. A common misconception about Argyrodes is that it steals prey from the host spider, but recent research has shown that Argyrodes rarely steals large prey items from the host, and only eats what the host spider typically does not want. They have been noticed in complex Joro spider webs, for example.

Kleptoparasitic spiders such as Argyrodes tend to prefer larger host webs over small ones, and multiple spiders often inhabit the same host web. Clustered webs were found to be preferred by Argyrodes, but only because these webs are generally larger than isolated ones. There does not appear to be any preference for clustered webs over isolated webs when comparing the number of spiders per web area. Kleptoparasitic spiders tend to spend much of their time on the outskirts of the host web, using this area as a safe place outside of the host spiders typical monitoring range. In addition to stealing food from the host web, dewdrop spiders are also known to use the host web as a location for mating as well as a place to hang their egg sacs.

In South America, Argyrodes spiders are the most common guest species in the webs of the colonial spiders Anelosimus eximius, where they primarily inhabit the upper strands of the large webs and descend into the main web to feed on prey remains.

=== Stridulation ===
Two South African species, A. stridulator and A. convivans, collected from the web of Trichonephila inaurata madagascariensis, have a stridulating organ consisting of two ridged, oval patches on the carapace that are scraped against a chitinous ring on the anterior apex of the abdomen.

== Species ==
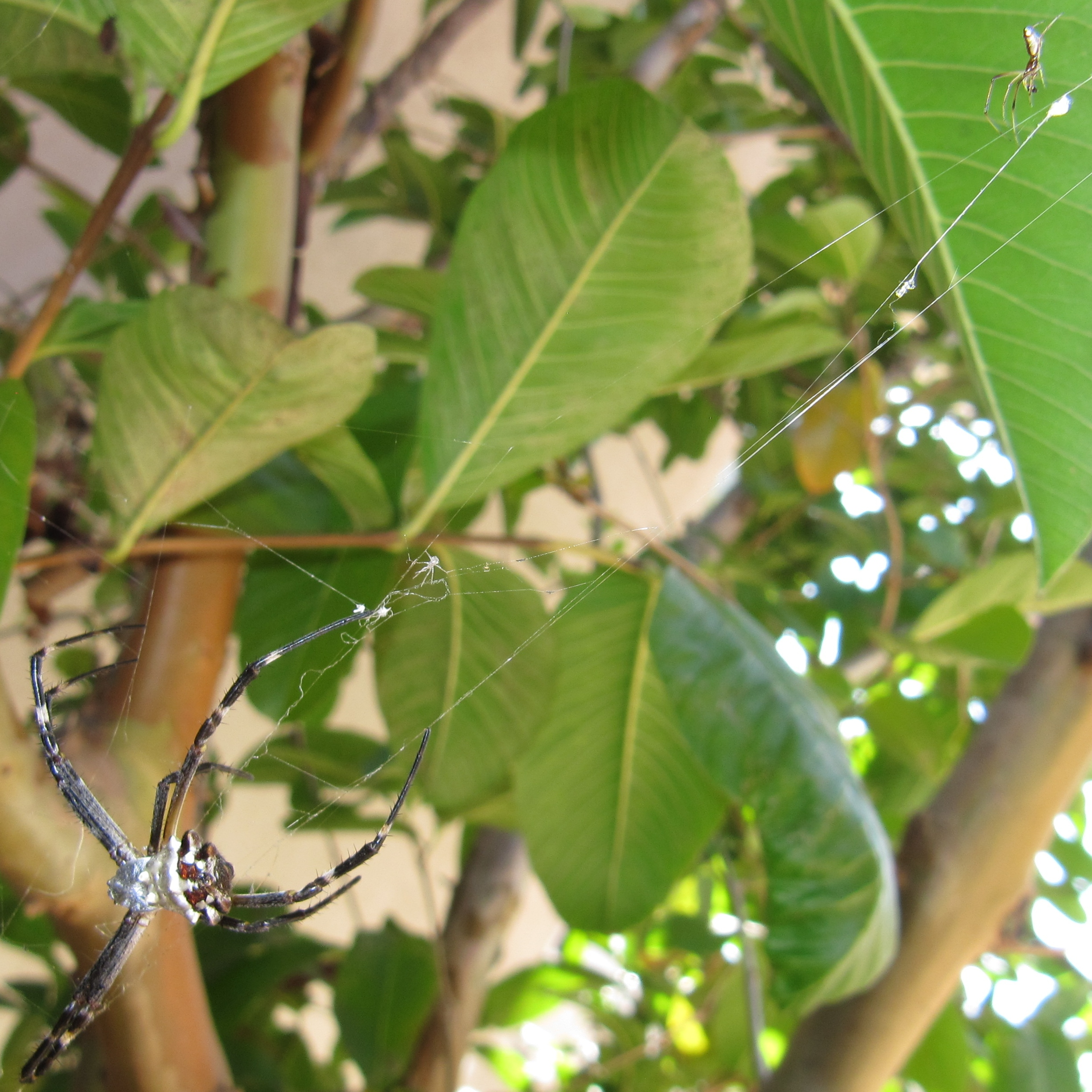
Female silver argiope (bottom-left) with dewdrop spider (top-right) living in its web, in California

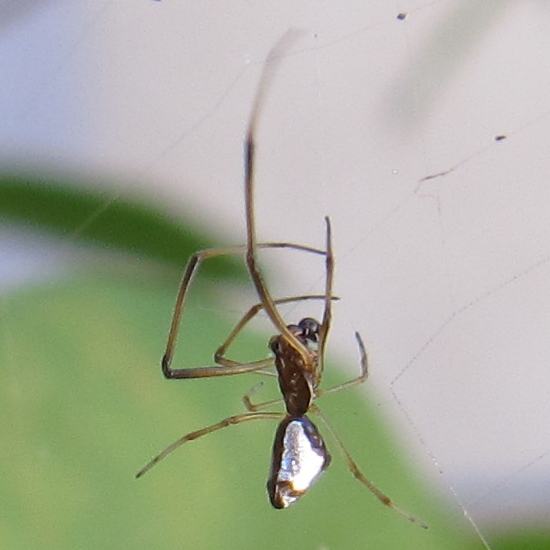
Close-up of the same dewdrop spider

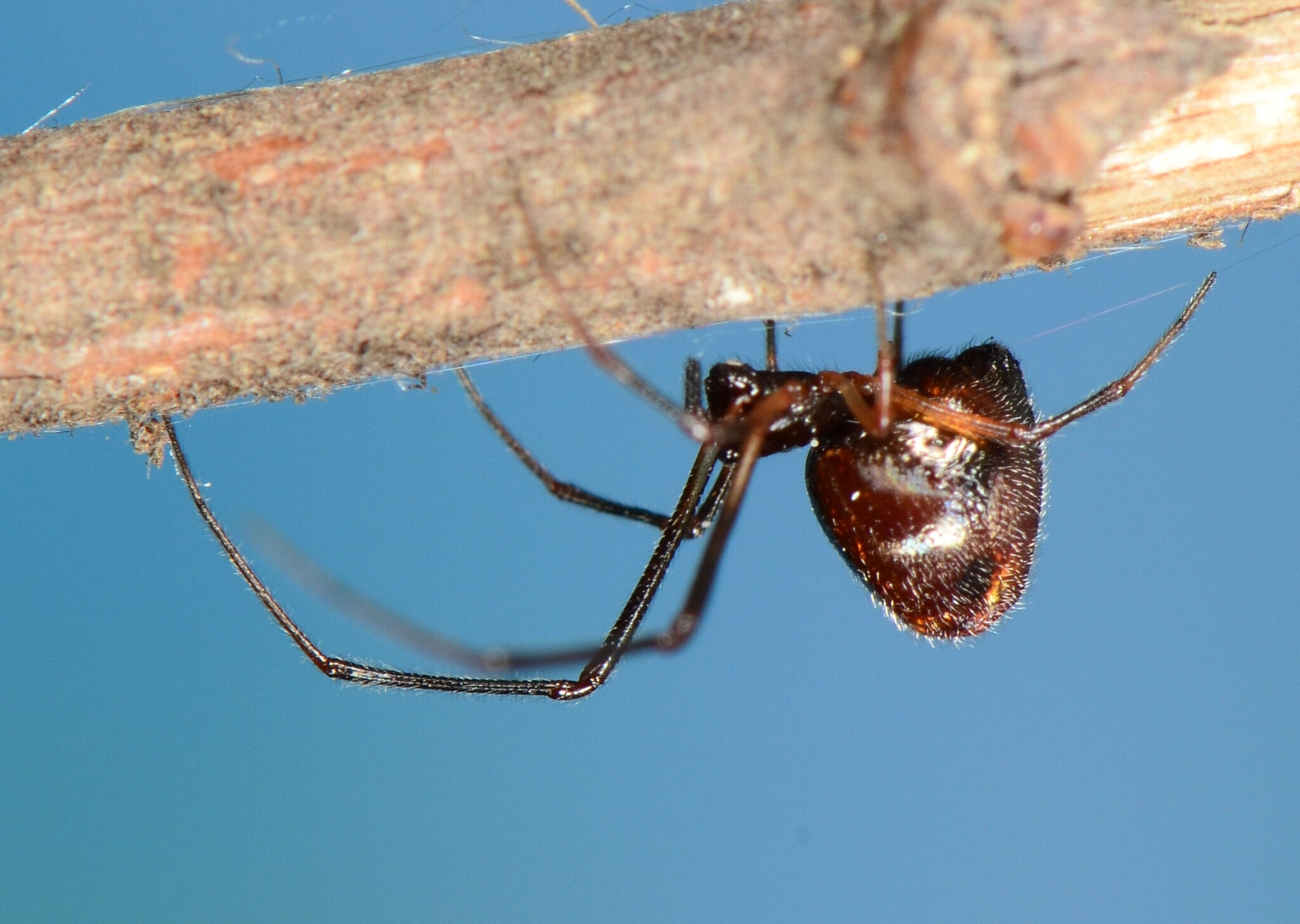
female A. zonatus

As of October 2025, this genus includes 85 species and five subspecies, found in Asia, South America, North America, Oceania, Africa, the Caribbean, on the Canary Islands, and Saint Helena. It also include 4 extinct species:

- Argyrodes abscissus O. Pickard-Cambridge, 1880 – Madagascar
- Argyrodes alannae Grostal, 1999 – Eastern Australia
- Argyrodes ambalikae Tikader, 1970 – India
- Argyrodes amboinensis Thorell, 1878 – Indonesia (Sulawesi, Ambon), New Guinea, New Caledonia
- Argyrodes antipodianus O. Pickard-Cambridge, 1880 – Australia, New Caledonia, New Zealand
- Argyrodes apiculatus Thorell, 1895 – Myanmar
- Argyrodes argentatus O. Pickard-Cambridge, 1880 – India, Indonesia to China. Introduced to Hawaii
- Argyrodes argyrodes (Walckenaer, 1841) – Mediterranean to West Africa. Introduced to St. Helena, South Africa, Seychelles, Hawaii (type species)
- Argyrodes atriapicatus Strand, 1906 – Ethiopia
- Argyrodes bandanus Strand, 1911 – Indonesia (Banda Is.)
- Argyrodes benedicti Lopez, 1988 – French Guiana
- Argyrodes binotatus Rainbow, 1915 – Australia
- Argyrodes bonadea (Karsch, 1881) – India, China, Korea, Taiwan, Japan, Philippines
- Argyrodes borbonicus Lopez, 1990 – Réunion
- Argyrodes callipygus Thorell, 1895 – Myanmar
- Argyrodes calmettei Lopez, 1990 – Réunion
- Argyrodes chionus Roberts, 1983 – Seychelles (Aldabra)
- Argyrodes chiriatapuensis Tikader, 1977 – India (Andaman Is.)
- Argyrodes chounguii Lopez, 2010 – Mayotte
- Argyrodes coactatus Lopez, 1988 – French Guiana
- Argyrodes cognatus (Blackwall, 1877) – Seychelles
- Argyrodes convivans Lawrence, 1937 – Zimbabwe, South Africa
- Argyrodes cylindratus Thorell, 1898 – China, Myanmar to Japan
- Argyrodes cyrtophorae Tikader, 1963 – India
- Argyrodes delicatulus Thorell, 1878 – Indonesia (Ambon)
- Argyrodes dipali Tikader, 1963 – India
- Argyrodes elevatus Taczanowski, 1873 – USA to Argentina, Galapagos
- Argyrodes exlineae (Caporiacco, 1949) – Kenya
- Argyrodes fasciatus Thorell, 1893 – Singapore
- Argyrodes fissifrons O. Pickard-Cambridge, 1869 – Sri Lanka to Indonesia, Papua New Guinea, China, Australia (Queensland)
  - A. f. terressae Thorell, 1891 – India (Nicobar Is.)
- Argyrodes fissifrontellus Saaristo, 1978 – Seychelles
- Argyrodes flavescens O. Pickard-Cambridge, 1880 – India, Sri Lanka to Japan, New Guinea
- Argyrodes flavipes Rainbow, 1916 – Australia (Queensland)
- Argyrodes fragilis Thorell, 1877 – Indonesia (Sulawesi)
- Argyrodes gazedes Tikader, 1970 – India
- Argyrodes gazingensis Tikader, 1970 – India
- Argyrodes gemmatus Rainbow, 1920 – Australia (Lord Howe Is.)
- Argyrodes gouri Tikader, 1963 – India
- Argyrodes gracilis (L. Koch, 1872) – Australia (Lord Howe Is.), New Caledonia, Samoa
- Argyrodes hawaiiensis Simon, 1900 – Hawaii
- Argyrodes ilipoepoe Rivera & Gillespie, 2010 – Hawaii
- Argyrodes incertus Wunderlich, 1987 – Canary Islands
- Argyrodes incisifrons Keyserling, 1890 – Australia (Queensland)
- Argyrodes insectus Schmidt, 2005 – Cape Verde
- Argyrodes jamkhedes Tikader, 1963 – India
- Argyrodes kratochvili (Caporiacco, 1949) – Kenya
- Argyrodes kualensis Hogg, 1927 – Malaysia
- Argyrodes kumadai Chida & Tanikawa, 1999 – China, Taiwan, Japan
- Argyrodes laja Rivera & Gillespie, 2010 – Hawaii
- Argyrodes latifolium Liu, Irfan & Peng, 2019 – China
- Argyrodes lepidus O. Pickard-Cambridge, 1880 – New Zealand
- Argyrodes levuca Strand, 1915 – Fiji
- Argyrodes lucmae Chamberlin, 1916 – Peru
- Argyrodes maculiger Strand, 1911 – Indonesia (Kei Is.)
- Argyrodes margaritarius (Rainbow, 1894) – Australia (New South Wales)
- Argyrodes mellissi (O. Pickard-Cambridge, 1870) – St. Helena
  - A. m. poecilior Strand, 1913 – DR Congo, Uganda
- Argyrodes minax O. Pickard-Cambridge, 1880 – Madagascar, Comoros
- Argyrodes miniaceus (Doleschall, 1857) – India, Korea, Japan to Australia
- Argyrodes modestus Thorell, 1899 – Cameroon
- Argyrodes nephilae Taczanowski, 1873 – United States, Caribbean to Argentina, Galapagos. Introduced to India
- Argyrodes parcestellatus Simon, 1909 – Vietnam
- Argyrodes pluto Banks, 1906 – United States, Mexico, Jamaica
- Argyrodes praeacutus Simon, 1903 – Equatorial Guinea
- Argyrodes projeles Tikader, 1970 – India
- Argyrodes reticola Strand, 1911 – Indonesia (Aru Is.)
- Argyrodes rostratus Blackwall, 1877 – Seychelles
- Argyrodes samoensis O. Pickard-Cambridge, 1880 – New Caledonia, Samoa
- Argyrodes scapulatus Schmidt & Piepho, 1994 – Cape Verde
- Argyrodes scintillulanus O. Pickard-Cambridge, 1880 – India, Sri Lanka
- Argyrodes sextuberculosus Strand, 1908 – Mozambique, South Africa, Madagascar
  - A. s. dilutior (Caporiacco, 1940) – Ethiopia
- Argyrodes strandi (Caporiacco, 1940) – Ethiopia
- Argyrodes stridulator Lawrence, 1937 – South Africa
- Argyrodes sublimis L. Koch, 1872 – Fiji
- Argyrodes sundaicus (Doleschall, 1859) – Thailand, Indonesia (Java), Papua New Guinea (New Britain)
- Argyrodes tenuis Thorell, 1877 – Indonesia (Sulawesi)
  - A. t. infumatus Thorell, 1878 – Indonesia (Ambon)
- Argyrodes tripunctatus Simon, 1877 – Philippines
- Argyrodes unimaculatus (Marples, 1955) – Samoa, Tongatabu, Niue
- Argyrodes vatovae (Caporiacco, 1940) – Ethiopia
- Argyrodes viridis (Vinson, 1863) – Madagascar, Réunion
- Argyrodes vittatus Bradley, 1877 – New Guinea
- Argyrodes weyrauchi Exline & Levi, 1962 – Peru
- Argyrodes wolfi Strand, 1911 – New Guinea
- Argyrodes yunnanensis Xu, Yin & Kim, 2000 – China
- Argyrodes zhui Zhu & Song, 1991 – China (Hainan)
- Argyrodes zonatus (Walckenaer, 1841) – Equatorial Guinea (Bioko), East Africa, South Africa, Eswatini, Madagascar, Réunion, Mayotte
  - A. z. occidentalis Simon, 1903 – Guinea-Bissau
- † Argyrodes copalis Wunderlich, 2008 – Colombian copal – Quaternary
- † Argyrodes resina Wunderlich, 2011 – Madagascar copal – Quaternary
- † Argyrodes gibbifera Wunderlich, 2004 – Madagascar copal – Quaternary
- † Argyrodes parvipatellaris Wunderlich, 1988 – Dominican amber – Miocene

Formerly included
- A. aculeatus (Thorell, 1898) (Transferred to Rhomphaea)
- A. acuminatus Keyserling, 1891 (Transferred to Faiditus)
- A. acuminatus (Schenkel, 1953) (Transferred to Chrysso)
- A. affinis (Lessert, 1936) (Transferred to Rhomphaea)
- A. alticeps Keyserling, 1891 (Transferred to Faiditus)
- A. altus Keyserling, 1891 (Transferred to Faiditus)
- A. amates Exline & Levi, 1962 (Transferred to Faiditus)
- A. americanus (Taczanowski, 1874) (Transferred to Faiditus)
- A. analiae González & Carmen, 1996 (Transferred to Faiditus)
- A. andamanensis Tikader, 1977 (Transferred to Meotipa)
- A. angulipalpis (Thorell, 1877) (Transferred to Rhomphaea)
- A. anomalus (Chamberlin & Ivie, 1936) (Transferred to Synotaxus)
- A. argenteolus (Simon, 1873) (Transferred to Rhomphaea)
- A. argentiopunctatus Rainbow, 1916 (Transferred to Thwaitesia)
- A. argyrodiformis (Yaginuma, 1952) (Transferred to Meotipa)
- A. arthuri Exline & Levi, 1962 (Transferred to Faiditus)
- A. atopus Chamberlin & Ivie, 1936 (Transferred to Faiditus)
- A. baboquivari Exline & Levi, 1962 (Transferred to Neospintharus)
- A. barycephalus Roberts, 1983 (Transferred to Rhomphaea)
- A. birgitae (Strand, 1917) (Transferred to Ariamnes)
- A. bryantae Exline & Levi, 1962 (Transferred to Faiditus)
- A. campestratus (Simon, 1903) (Transferred to Ariamnes)
- A. canariensis (Schmidt, 1956) (Transferred to Rhomphaea)
- A. cancellatus (Hentz, 1850) (Transferred to Faiditus)
- A. carnicobarensis Tikader, 1977 (Transferred to Faiditus)
- A. caronae González & Carmen, 1996 (Transferred to Faiditus)
- A. caudatus (Taczanowski, 1874) (Transferred to Faiditus)
- A. ceraosus Zhu & Song, 1991 (Transferred to Rhomphaea)
- A. chicaensis González & Carmen, 1996 (Transferred to Faiditus)
- A. chickeringi Exline & Levi, 1962 (Transferred to Faiditus)
- A. cochleaformus (Exline, 1945) (Transferred to Faiditus)
- A. colubrinus (Keyserling, 1890) (Transferred to Ariamnes)
- A. cometes (L. Koch, 1872) (Transferred to Rhomphaea)
- A. concisus Exline & Levi, 1962 (Transferred to Neospintharus)
- A. conus González & Carmen, 1996 (Transferred to Rhomphaea)
- A. convolutus Exline & Levi, 1962 (Transferred to Faiditus)
- A. cordillera (Exline, 1945) (Transferred to Faiditus)
- A. corniger (Simon, 1900) (Transferred to Ariamnes)
- A. cristinae González & Carmen, 1996 (Transferred to Faiditus)
- A. crucinotus Bösenberg & Strand, 1906 (Transferred to Leucauge)
- A. cubensis Exline & Levi, 1962 (Transferred to Faiditus)
- A. cylindricus Franganillo, 1936 (Transferred to Faiditus)
- A. cylindrogaster (Simon, 1889) (Transferred to Ariamnes)
- A. darlingtoni Exline & Levi, 1962 (Transferred to Faiditus)
- A. davisi Exline & Levi, 1962 (Transferred to Faiditus)
- A. delicatulus (Simon, 1883) (Transferred to Rhomphaea)
- A. dracus Chamberlin & Ivie, 1936 (Transferred to Faiditus)
- A. duckensis González & Carmen, 1996 (Transferred to Faiditus)
- A. ecaudatus (Keyserling, 1884) (Transferred to Faiditus)
- A. exiguus Exline & Levi, 1962 (Transferred to Faiditus)
- A. fictilium (Hentz, 1850) (Transferred to Rhomphaea)
- A. flagellum (Doleschall, 1857) (Transferred to Ariamnes)
- A. flagellum (Simon, 1901) (Transferred to Ariamnes)
- A. flavonotatus (Urquhart, 1890) (Transferred to Tekelloides)
- A. floridanus Banks, 1900 (Transferred to Coleosoma)
- A. frontatus Banks, 1908 (Transferred to Neospintharus)
- A. fulvus Exline & Levi, 1962 (Transferred to Faiditus)
- A. fur Bösenberg & Strand, 1906 (Transferred to Neospintharus)
- A. gansuensis Zhu, 1998 (Transferred to Neospintharus)
- A. gapensis Exline & Levi, 1962 (Transferred to Faiditus)
- A. gertschi Exline & Levi, 1962 (Transferred to Faiditus)
- A. globosus Keyserling, 1884 (Transferred to Faiditus)
- A. godmani Exline & Levi, 1962 (Transferred to Faiditus)
- A. haitensis Exline & Levi, 1962 (Transferred to Ariamnes)
- A. helminthoides (Simon, 1907) (Transferred to Ariamnes)
- A. huangsangensis Yin, Peng & Bao, 2004 (Transferred to Spheropistha)
- A. hyrcanus Logunov & Marusik, 1990 (Transferred to Rhomphaea)
- A. iguazuensis González & Carmen, 1996 (Transferred to Faiditus)
- A. indignus Chamberlin & Ivie, 1936 (Transferred to Faiditus)
- A. irroratus (Thorell, 1898) (Transferred to Rhomphaea)
- A. jamaicensis Exline & Levi, 1962 (Transferred to Faiditus)
- A. jeanneli (Berland, 1920) (Transferred to Ariamnes)
- A. labiatus Zhu & Song, 1991 (Transferred to Rhomphaea)
- A. lactifer (Simon, 1909) (Transferred to Rhomphaea)
- A. laraensis González & Carmen, 1996 (Transferred to Faiditus)
- A. leonensis Exline & Levi, 1962 (Transferred to Faiditus)
- A. levii Zhu & Song, 1991 (Transferred to Faiditus)
- A. longispinus Saito, 1933 (Transferred to Cyclosa)
- A. longissimus (Keyserling, 1891) (Transferred to Ariamnes)
- A. longus (Kulczyński, 1905) (Transferred to Rhomphaea)
- A. manta (Exline, 1945) (Transferred to Faiditus)
- A. mariae González & Carmen, 1996 (Transferred to Faiditus)
- A. martinae (Exline, 1950) (Transferred to Rhomphaea)
- A. melanosoma (Yaginuma, 1957) (Transferred to Spheropistha)
- A. metaltissimus (Soares & Camargo, 1948) (Transferred to Rhomphaea)
- A. mexicanus Exline & Levi, 1962 (Transferred to Ariamnes)
- A. miyashitai Tanikawa, 1998 (Transferred to Spheropistha)
- A. monoceros (Caporiacco, 1947) (Transferred to Synotaxus)
- A. montanus Keyserling, 1884 (Transferred to Neospintharus)
- A. morretensis González & Carmen, 1996 (Transferred to Faiditus)
- A. nasicus (Simon, 1873) (Transferred to Rhomphaea)
- A. nataliae González & Carmen, 1996 (Transferred to Faiditus)
- A. nigronodosus Rainbow, 1912 (Transferred to Thwaitesia)
- A. nigroris Yoshida, Tso & Severinghaus, 2000 (Transferred to Spheropistha)
- A. nipponicus Kumada, 1990 (Transferred to Neospintharus)
- A. obscurus Keyserling, 1884 (Transferred to Neospintharus)
- A. orbitus Zhu, 1998 (Transferred to Spheropistha)
- A. oris González & Carmen, 1996 (Transferred to Rhomphaea)
- A. ornatissimus (Dyal, 1935) (Transferred to Rhomphaea)
- A. pachysomus Chamberlin & Ivie, 1936 (Transferred to Faiditus)
- A. palmarensis González & Carmen, 1996 (Transferred to Rhomphaea)
- A. paradoxus Taczanowski, 1873 (Transferred to Rhomphaea)
- A. parvior Chamberlin & Ivie, 1936 (Transferred to Faiditus)
- A. parvus (Exline, 1950) (Transferred to Neospintharus)
- A. patersoniensis (Hickman, 1927) (Transferred to Ariamnes)
- A. pavesii (Leardi, 1902) (Transferred to Ariamnes)
- A. peruensis Exline & Levi, 1962 (Transferred to Faiditus)
- A. pignalitoensis González & Carmen, 1996 (Transferred to Rhomphaea)
- A. pizai (Soares & Camargo, 1948) (Transferred to Faiditus)
- A. plaumanni Exline & Levi, 1962 (Transferred to Faiditus)
- A. pozonae (Schenkel, 1953) (Transferred to Faiditus)
- A. proboscifer (Exline, 1945) (Transferred to Faiditus)
- A. pulcher (Soares & Camargo, 1948) (Transferred to Ariamnes)
- A. pusillus Saaristo, 1978 (Transferred to Argyrodella)
- A. quasiobtusus Exline & Levi, 1962 (Transferred to Faiditus)
- A. recurvatus Saaristo, 1978 (Transferred to Rhomphaea)
- A. remotus (Bryant, 1940) (Transferred to Rhomphaea)
- A. rhomboides Yin, Peng & Bao, 2004 (Transferred to Spheropistha)
- A. rigidus Exline & Levi, 1962 (Transferred to Faiditus)
- A. rioensis Exline & Levi, 1962 (Transferred to Neospintharus)
- A. rorerae (Exline, 1945) (Transferred to Faiditus)
- A. rossi Exline & Levi, 1962 (Transferred to Faiditus)
- A. rostratus (Simon, 1873) (Transferred to Rhomphaea)
- A. rufopictus (Thorell, 1895) (Transferred to Ariamnes)
- A. russulus (Simon, 1903) (Transferred to Ariamnes)
- A. saganus (Dönitz & Strand, 1906) (Transferred to Rhomphaea)
- A. schlingeri Exline & Levi, 1962 (Transferred to Ariamnes)
- A. setipes (Hasselt, 1882) (Transferred to Ariamnes)
- A. sicki Exline & Levi, 1962 (Transferred to Faiditus)
- A. simoni (Petrunkevitch, 1911) (Transferred to Rhomphaea)
- A. sinicus Zhu & Song, 1991 (Transferred to Rhomphaea)
- A. sinuatus (Schenkel, 1953) (Transferred to Ariamnes)
- A. sjostedti (Tullgren, 1910) (Transferred to Rhomphaea)
- A. socius Chamberlin & Ivie, 1936 (Transferred to Faiditus)
- A. solidao Levi, 1967 (Transferred to Faiditus)
- A. spinicaudatus (Keyserling, 1884) (Transferred to Rhomphaea)
- A. spinosus (Badcock, 1932) (Transferred to Rhomphaea)
- A. spinosus Keyserling, 1884 (Transferred to Faiditus)
- A. striatus Keyserling, 1891 (Transferred to Faiditus)
- A. subflavus Exline & Levi, 1962 (Transferred to Faiditus)
- A. sullana (Exline, 1945) (Transferred to Faiditus)
- A. taeter Exline & Levi, 1962 (Transferred to Faiditus)
- A. tanikawai (Yoshida, 2001) (Transferred to Rhomphaea)
- A. triangularis Taczanowski, 1873 (Transferred to Neospintharus)
- A. triangulatus (Urquhart, 1887) (Transferred to Ariamnes)
- A. triangulus (Thorell, 1887) (Transferred to Ariamnes)
- A. trigonum (Hentz, 1850) (Transferred to Neospintharus)
- A. trituberculatus Becker, 1879 (Transferred to Faiditus)
- A. ululabilis Keyserling, 1891 (Transferred to Faiditus)
- A. urquharti (Bryant, 1933) (Transferred to Rhomphaea)
- A. v-notatus (Petrunkevitch, 1925) (Transferred to Faiditus)
- A. vadoensis González & Carmen, 1996 (Transferred to Faiditus)
- A. velhaensis González & Carmen, 1996 (Transferred to Rhomphaea)
- A. vexus Chamberlin & Ivie, 1936 (Transferred to Faiditus)
- A. vittatulus (Roewer, 1942) (Transferred to Chrysso)
- A. woytkowskii Exline & Levi, 1962 (Transferred to Faiditus)
- A. xiphias Thorell, 1887 (Transferred to Faiditus)
- A. yacuiensis González & Carmen, 1996 (Transferred to Faiditus)
- A. yesoensis Saito, 1934 (Transferred to Octonoba)
- A. yutoensis González & Carmen, 1996 (Transferred to Faiditus)

Nomina dubia

- A. meus Strand, 1907
- A. silvicola Saito, 1934
