= Argyrodes rostratus =

Conservation status
- Least Concern (IUCN 3.1)

Scientific classification
- Domain: Eukaryota
- Kingdom: Animalia
- Phylum: Arthropoda
- Subphylum: Chelicerata
- Class: Arachnida
- Order: Araneae
- Infraorder: Araneomorphae
- Family: Theridiidae
- Genus: Argyrodes
- Species: A. rostratus

Binomial name
- Argyrodes rostratus Blackwall, 1877

Synonyms
- Argyrodes nephilae rostratus Saaristo, 1978

Species of spider

Argyrodes rostratus is a species of tangle-web spider that is endemic to the Seychelles, and can be found on Mahé, Île Sèche, Cerf, Conception, Silhouette, Curieuse, Cousin, Aride, Praslin, La Digue, Grand Sœur, Felicite, Marianne, Denis islands and the Alphonse and St. François atolls. It is found in woodland, shrubby habitat and gardens, and is a kleptoparasite of red-legged golden orb-web spiders. It is threatened by habitat deterioration due to invasive plants, especially Cinnamomum verum.
