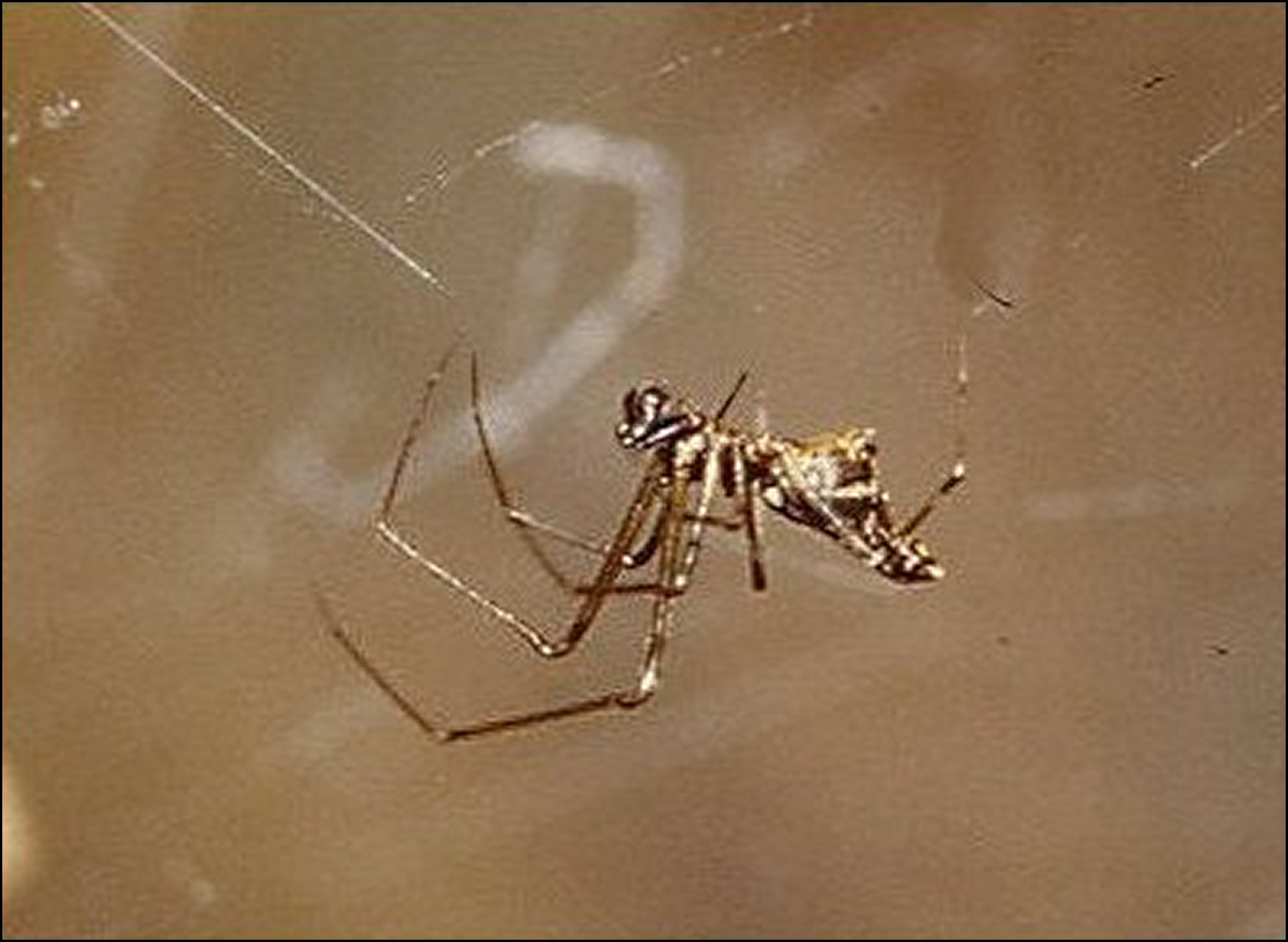

Conservation status
- Vulnerable (IUCN 3.1)

Scientific classification
- Domain: Eukaryota
- Kingdom: Animalia
- Phylum: Arthropoda
- Subphylum: Chelicerata
- Class: Arachnida
- Order: Araneae
- Infraorder: Araneomorphae
- Family: Theridiidae
- Genus: Argyrodes
- Species: A. cognatus

Binomial name
- Argyrodes cognatus (Blackwall, 1877)

Synonyms
- Epeira cognata Blackwall, 1877

= Argyrodes cognatus =

Species of spider

Argyrodes cognatus is a species of tangle-web spider that is endemic to the Seychelles, and can be found on Mahé, Conception, Silhouette and Marianne islands. It is found in woodland habitats where it spins orb webs in herbaceous vegetation. It is threatened by habitat deterioration due to invasive plants, especially Cinnamomum verum.
