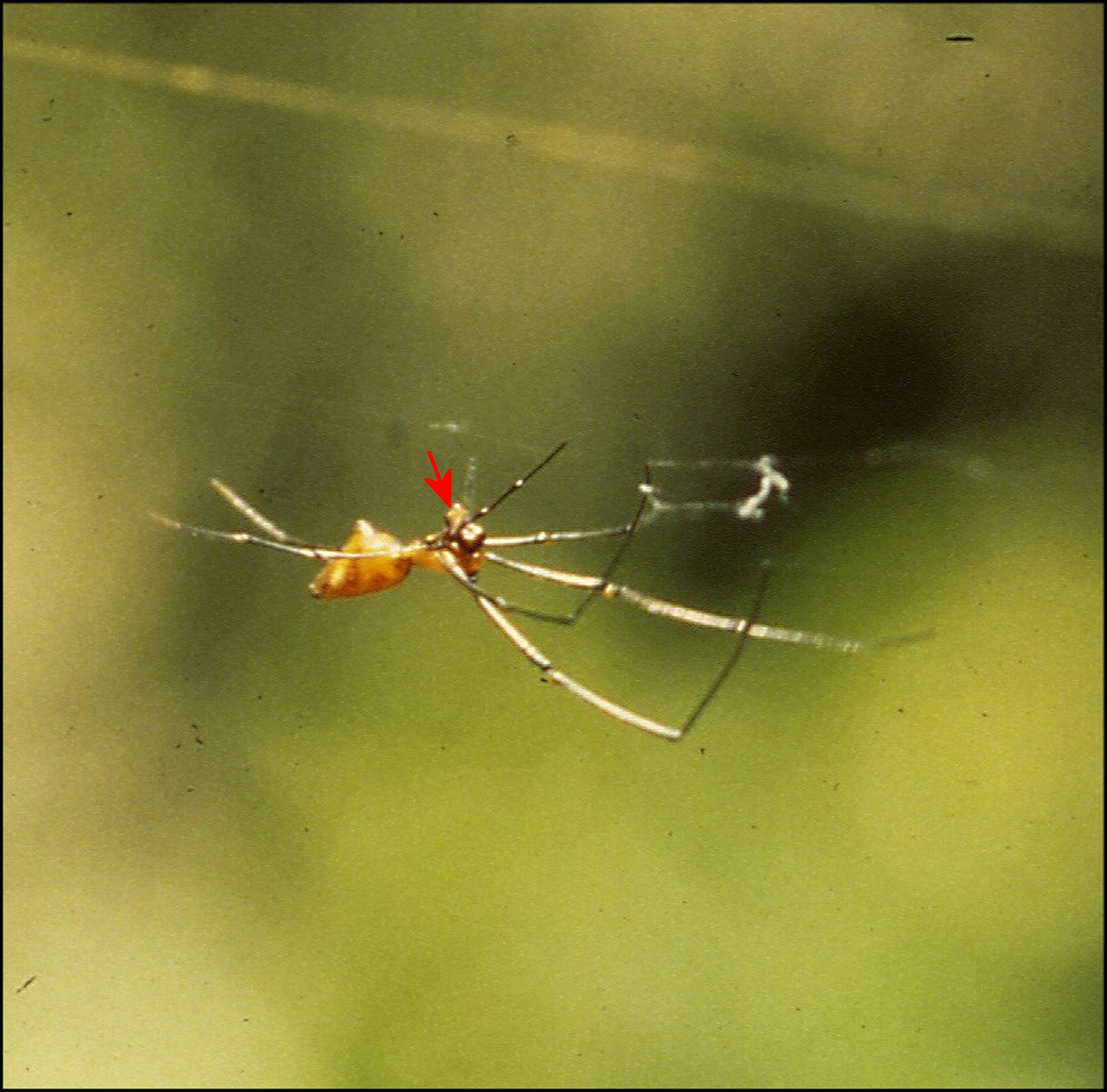
- Argyrodes fissifrontellus

Conservation status
- Vulnerable (IUCN 3.1)

Scientific classification
- Kingdom: Animalia
- Phylum: Arthropoda
- Subphylum: Chelicerata
- Class: Arachnida
- Order: Araneae
- Infraorder: Araneomorphae
- Family: Theridiidae
- Genus: Argyrodes
- Species: A. fissifrontellus

Binomial name
- Argyrodes fissifrontellus Saaristo, 1978

Synonyms
- Argyrodes fissifrontella Saaristo, 1978

= Argyrodes fissifrontellus =

Species of spider

Argyrodes fissifrontellus is a species of tangle-web spider that is endemic to the Seychelles, and can be found on Mahé and Silhouette islands. It is found in woodland areas where it spins orb webs in vegetation, or is a keptoparasite in red-legged golden orb-web spider webs. It is threatened by habitat deterioration due to invasive plants, especially Cinnamomum verum.
