= Argyrodes pluto =

Scientific classification
- Domain: Eukaryota
- Kingdom: Animalia
- Phylum: Arthropoda
- Subphylum: Chelicerata
- Class: Arachnida
- Order: Araneae
- Infraorder: Araneomorphae
- Family: Theridiidae
- Genus: Argyrodes
- Species: A. pluto

Binomial name
- Argyrodes pluto Banks, 1906

Species of spider

Argyrodes pluto is a species of cobweb spider in the family Theridiidae. It is found in the United States, Mexico, and Jamaica.
