= Argyrodes scapulatus =

Scientific classification
- Domain: Eukaryota
- Kingdom: Animalia
- Phylum: Arthropoda
- Subphylum: Chelicerata
- Class: Arachnida
- Order: Araneae
- Infraorder: Araneomorphae
- Family: Theridiidae
- Genus: Argyrodes
- Species: A. scapulatus

Binomial name
- Argyrodes scapulatus Schmidt & Piepho, 1994

Species of spider

Argyrodes scapulatus is a species of spiders of the family Theridiidae that is endemic in Cape Verde. The species was named and first described in 1994.
