= Argyrodes sextuberculosus =

Mozambique Argyrodes Dew-Drop Spider

Scientific classification
- Kingdom: Animalia
- Phylum: Arthropoda
- Subphylum: Chelicerata
- Class: Arachnida
- Order: Araneae
- Infraorder: Araneomorphae
- Family: Theridiidae
- Genus: Argyrodes
- Species: A. sextuberculosus

Binomial name
- Argyrodes sextuberculosus Strand, 1908

Synonyms
- Argyrodes cyclosiformis Strand, 1908

Species of spider

Argyrodes sextuberculosus is a species of spider in the family Theridiidae. It is commonly known as the Mozambique Argyrodes dew-drop spider.

== Distribution ==
Argyrodes sextuberculosus is found in Mozambique, Madagascar, and South Africa.

In South Africa, this species is recorded from KwaZulu-Natal and Limpopo provinces. Locations include Tembe Elephant Park and Venetia Limpopo Valley Reserve.

== Habitat and ecology ==
These spiders are kleptoparasites.

The species has been sampled at an altitude of 582 m.

== Conservation ==
Argyrodes sextuberculosus is listed as Least Concern by the South African National Biodiversity Institute due to its wide global geographical range. This introduced species is still undersampled in South Africa. There are no known threats.

== Taxonomy ==
Argyrodes sextuberculosus was described by Strand in 1908 from Mozambique. The species is known from both sexes.
