= Rhinoliparus =

Scientific classification
- Kingdom: Animalia
- Phylum: Arthropoda
- Subphylum: Chelicerata
- Class: Arachnida
- Order: Araneae
- Infraorder: Araneomorphae
- Family: Theridiidae
- Subfamily: Argyrodinae
- Genus: Rhinoliparus; Vanuytven, Jocqué & Deeleman-Reinhold, 2024

Genus of spiders

Rhinoliparus is a genus of comb-footed spiders.

== Taxonomy ==
Rhinoliparus contains the following species:

- Rhinoliparus neocaledonicus Berland, 1924 - New Caledonia
- Rhinoliparus platyrhinus Vanuytven, Jocqué & Deeleman-Reinhold, 2024 - Philippines
- Rhinoliparus kulczynskii Roewer, 1942 - Laos, Cambodia, Malaysia, Indonesia, Papua New Guinea
- Rhinoliparus lanyuensis Vanuytven, Jocqué & Deeleman-Reinhold, 2024 - Papua New Guinea
- Rhinoliparus missai Vanuytven, Jocqué & Deeleman-Reinhold, 2024 - Papua New Guinea
- Rhinoliparus nafithiamae Vanuytven, Jocqué & Deeleman-Reinhold, 2024 - Papua New Guinea
- Rhinoliparus queensland Vanuytven, Jocqué & Deeleman-Reinhold, 2024 - Australia
- Rhinoliparus rainbowi Roewer, 1942 - Australia
