= Argyrodes lepidus =

Conservation status
- Data Deficit (NZ TCS)

Scientific classification
- Kingdom: Animalia
- Phylum: Arthropoda
- Subphylum: Chelicerata
- Class: Arachnida
- Order: Araneae
- Infraorder: Araneomorphae
- Family: Theridiidae
- Genus: Argyrodes
- Species: A. lepidus

Binomial name
- Argyrodes lepidus O. P.-Cambridge, 1879

Species of spider

Argyrodes lepidus is a species of tangle web spider in the genus Argyrodes found in New Zealand.

== Taxonomy ==
This species was described in 1880 by Octavius Pickard-Cambridge from a female specimen.

== Distribution ==
This species is only known from New Zealand.

== Conservation status ==
Under the New Zealand Threat Classification System, this species is listed as "Data Deficient" with the qualifiers of "Data Poor: Size", "Data Poor: Trend" and "One Location".
