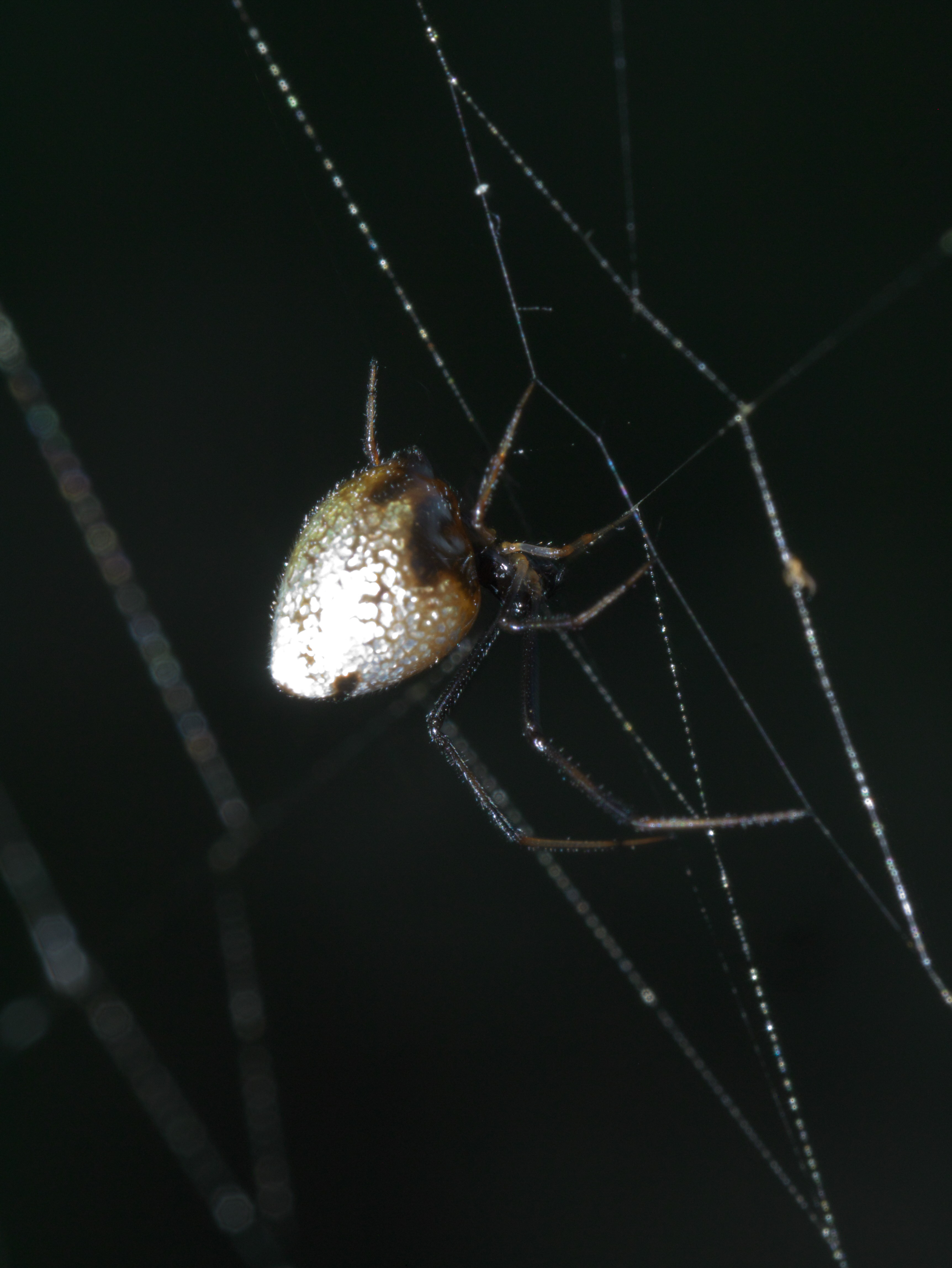

Scientific classification
- Kingdom: Animalia
- Phylum: Arthropoda
- Subphylum: Chelicerata
- Class: Arachnida
- Order: Araneae
- Infraorder: Araneomorphae
- Family: Theridiidae
- Genus: Argyrodes
- Species: A. elevatus

Binomial name
- Argyrodes elevatus Taczanowski, 1873

= Argyrodes elevatus =

Species of spider

Argyrodes elevatus, commonly referred to as dew-drop spider, is a species of arachnid in the family Theridiidae. These spiders are most commonly found in subtropical and tropical regions in South and Central America, as well as southern regions of the United States. One of the key distinguishing characteristics of A. elevatus is its kleptoparasitic behavior through which it primarily procures food for survival. Typically 1 or 2 A. elevatus spiders preside in outer areas of webs built by other species of spiders, although it is possible for up to 45 spiders to share a web. There are two main mechanisms by which A. elevatus raid the hub of the host's web to steal insects preyed and wrapped by the host spider. A. elevatus follows an intricate course to the hub of the web to search for prey, using vibrational detection enhanced by laid out threads along the web to find and capture the insect. These spiders are highly efficient, with the theft lasting a maximum of 12 seconds and high success rates. This reliance on a host spider for food has led to adaptations in sleep schedules and alternate food sources to revolve around the host species activity. A. elevatus display a unique courtship routine in which male A. elevatus presents prey wrapped in silk as a nuptial gift to the female spider. The male spider approaches the female, carrying the nuptial gift on its chelicerae while communicating with a distinct courting vibration, followed by copulation. Approximately twenty-four hours after the A. elevatus courtship and copulation series of events, the female spider will lay one to two eggs on the outer regions of the host's web.

== Description ==
Argyrodes elevatus spiders' small bodies can be divided into two regions: the cephalothorax, which consists of the head and legs, and the abdomen. The head is usually a dark color, ranging from brown to black. The legs extending from this division are a lighter brown, with the ends of the legs returning to the darker color similar to the head. The second division, the abdomen, has a silver, bulb-like, conical appearance with a dark line extending down the length of the spider. With the two divisions combined, the spider is approximately 4–7 mm in length.

Males are smaller than females, with a lower and upwards pointing abdominal division.

== Habitat and distribution ==
Argyrodes elevatus are primarily found in Central America, South America, and the southern-most areas of the United States. Within the United States, Argyrodes elevatus spiders can be found spanning regions including California, Texas, Florida, and Virginia. Because of the spider's preference for tropical and subtropical climates, large populations have been discovered in Trinidad.

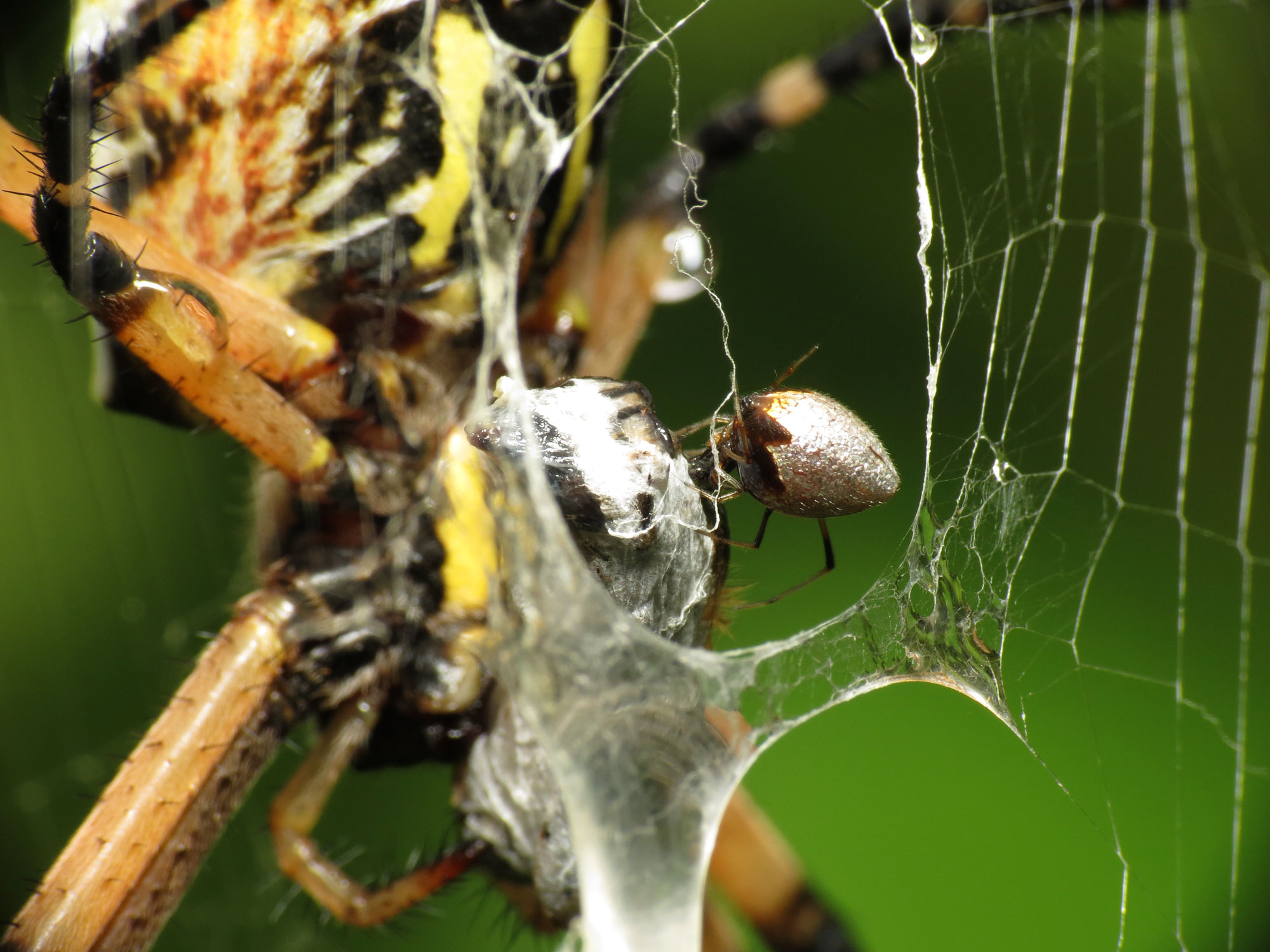
A. elevatus feeding on the prey of the yellow garden spider

== Diet ==
=== Prey-capture ===
The bulk of the diet obtained by adult A. elevatus comes from stealing food from the host spider, such as host egg sacs or insects and other organisms trapped in the web silk threads. Small prey that have not yet been detected by the host spider can be easily stolen from the webs, while prey that have already been attacked and stored for later use may be more difficult to obtain. Larger prey ranging up to sizes ten times larger than it, have usually been previously predigested by the host spider prior to stealing. This behavior is attributed to age-related decreased ability to trap prey in silk thread due to either lack of sticky silk production or slower rate of wrapping.

=== Host predation ===
Sometimes, A. elevatus does not steal an entire prey-packet from the hub of the host's web, but shares it with the host at the hub instead. Furthermore, some A. elevatus spiders, particularly juvenile A. elevatus, feed on the host spider. This behavior is based on the differences in size and number of other caught prey available on the web. More specifically, predation is most common when there are fewer prey present in the host's web and when the two spiders are similar in size.

=== Web material ===
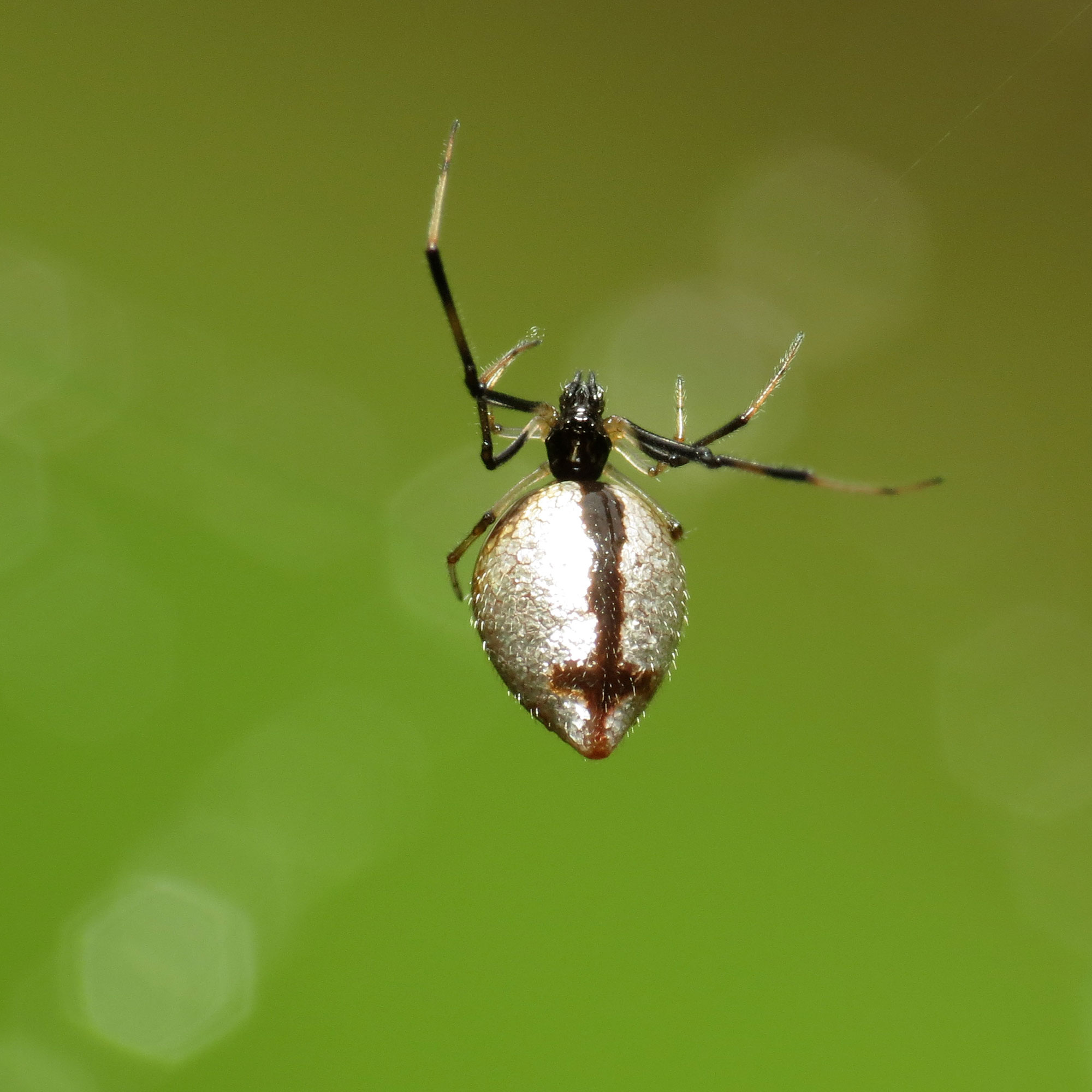
Argyrodes elevatus image highlighting dark line going down length of the spider

During shortages of regional prey-density, the host will protect its prey-packets from kleptoparasitic spiders even more, limiting the theft success rates and thus diminishing access to food for A. elevatus. Silk from the host's web can also provide a more stable food source, especially during these periods of low success in prey-capture. Even when A. elevatus is successful in capturing the host's insects, web material may also serve as an additional source of nutrition.

=== Parasitic relationships ===
Due to the poor vision of Argiope argentata, an orb-weaving spider, the parasitic A. elevatus is often able to get away clean with both residing in a foreign nest and eating stolen food. A. elevatus is further able to evade detection as its movements do not trigger the vibration receptors of Argiope argentata. While different situations lead to different levels of effectiveness in the klepto foraging style, the Argyrodes elevatus is by no means a friend to Argiope argentata.

== Reproduction ==
Approximately twenty-four hours after the A. elevatus courtship and copulation series of events, the female spider will lay one to two eggs on the outer regions of the host's web. The eggs are embedded on thread structures in these regions and then left without any parental protection immediately.

== Mating ==
=== Male-female interactions ===
==== Nuptial gifts ====
During courtship, male members of the A. elevatus species present a nuptial gift, often prey wrapped in silk, to the female. One example of prey offered as the nuptial gift is C. huila. The male spider approaches the female, carrying the nuptial gift on its chelicerae while communicating with a distinct courting vibration. This sequence is different from other spider species that engage in this behavior. This sequence of courtship events, followed by copulation between the two spiders, may last between two and eight hours. This is the longest-lasting activity within the species, as other interactions range mainly between three seconds to six minutes.

===== Pheromonal communication =====
Recent studies have identified novel long-chain fatty acid esters consisting of unique functional groups that could play a role in chemical communication between A. elevatus spiders. However, more investigation is required to further examine this finding and determine its relevance as it pertains to the mating behavior of A. elevatus.

== Behavior ==
=== Kleptoparasitism ===
Argyrodes elevatus presides in the outer area of webs built by the Argiope argentata and Nephila clavipes spiders, which are two types of araneid spiders. It is also found in the colonial webs of Metepeira incrassata, the Mexican orb-weaving spider. A. elevatus primarily reduces the prey availability for M. incrassata through this kleptoparasitic behavior. Up to 45 A. elevatus spiders may be present on a single web depending on the season and host-spider density in the region. There are two main mechanisms by which A. elevatus steals both small and large prey from the host spiders that differ in the timing of the raid. In one strategy, A. elevatus moves towards the center of the web, or the hub, once the host spider has wrapped an insect to immobilize it and leaves to capture another insect. The second strategy follows similar steps, but A. elevatus instead waits for multiple insects to be wrapped into a prey-packet prior to rushing towards the hub to steal the host's captured prey. Studies have shown that the first strategy is more commonly employed by the kleptoparasitic spiders due to higher success rates.

==== Mechanism of prey-capture ====
Argyrodes elevatus spiders sense vibrations along the threads of the web to detect silk wrapping of prey by the host spider. In order to best detect these vibrations, A. elevatus produces fine threads that are spread out along the web's radii, including the hub where the prey most-likely reside. These signals are detected by moving its long front legs in a forward and then sideways direction to tap the threads as it slowly moves. The slow movements are aimed to reduce the chances of alerting the host spider of its approach. Once the vibrational cues signal the presence of captured prey, the spider is then triggered to move towards the prey to procure for its own food supply. Studies have suggested that chemotaxis may also play a role in locating the captured prey.

==== Securing prey-capture ====
Once the prey is identified with the front legs of A. elevatus, various threads are drawn. One thread secures the wrapped prey-packet or single insect to be placed into its chelicerae, while the other threads are placed to direct the spider back to the outer safe regions of the web. These escape threads can be followed after A. elevatus cuts up to 4 cm sections of the host's web threads to detach the prey and retreat. The entire raid, from finding the prey to securing the theft for return to the outskirts, has been seen to be completed in less than twelve seconds on certain occasions.

==== Success of prey-capture ====
If host spiders sense the loss of their stored prey, they may attempt to search the hub for the intruding kleptoparasite and disrupt the theft by aggressively shaking the threads, causing A. elevatus to be shaken off the thread or to retreat. However, it is more common for the host to retrieve the captured prey by intercepting the theft. Studies have shown that A. elevatus are highly successful at capturing prey without being intercepted by the host. One experiment showed an approximate success rate of 67%.

=== Sleeping patterns ===
Because of its kleptoparasitic behavior, A. elevatus has opposite patterns of sleep-wake cycles and activity than its host. These host spiders are often diurnal, making A. elevatus most commonly nocturnal. However, this can change if there are multiple species of spiders with different periods of activity. Monitoring host activity is achieved by sensing vibrations within the web signaling host movement.
