= Argyrodes stridulator =

Zululand Argyrodes Dew-Drop Spider

Scientific classification
- Kingdom: Animalia
- Phylum: Arthropoda
- Subphylum: Chelicerata
- Class: Arachnida
- Order: Araneae
- Infraorder: Araneomorphae
- Family: Theridiidae
- Genus: Argyrodes
- Species: A. stridulator

Binomial name
- Argyrodes stridulator Lawrence, 1937

Species of spider

Argyrodes stridulator is a species of spider in the family Theridiidae. It is endemic to South Africa and is commonly known as the Zululand Argyrodes dew-drop spider.

== Distribution ==
Argyrodes stridulator is found in South Africa. In South Africa, it is endemic to KwaZulu-Natal province. Locations include iSimangaliso Wetland Park (Kosi Bay Nature Reserve), Ndumo Game Reserve, and Ophathe Game Reserve.

== Habitat and ecology ==
These spiders are kleptoparasites. This species steals prey from the webs of other spiders. Only a few spiders from this genus catch prey in their own webs. Argyrodes stridulator species was sampled from orb-webs of other spiders. It was sampled from the Indian Ocean Coastal Belt and Savanna biomes at altitudes ranging from 47 to 40 m.

A. stridulator and A. convivans have a stridulating organ consisting of two ridged, oval patches on the carapace that are scraped against a chitinous ring on the anterior apex of the abdomen.

== Conservation ==
Argyrodes stridulator is listed as Least Concern by the South African National Biodiversity Institute. All known records are from within protected areas. It is suspected to be undercollected and much suitable natural habitat exists within its range. There are no significant threats to this species. It is protected in Ophathe Game Reserve, Kosi Bay Nature Reserve, and Ndumo Game Reserve.

== Taxonomy ==
Argyrodes stridulator was described by Lawrence in 1937 from Kosi Bay Nature Reserve. The species is known only from the male.
