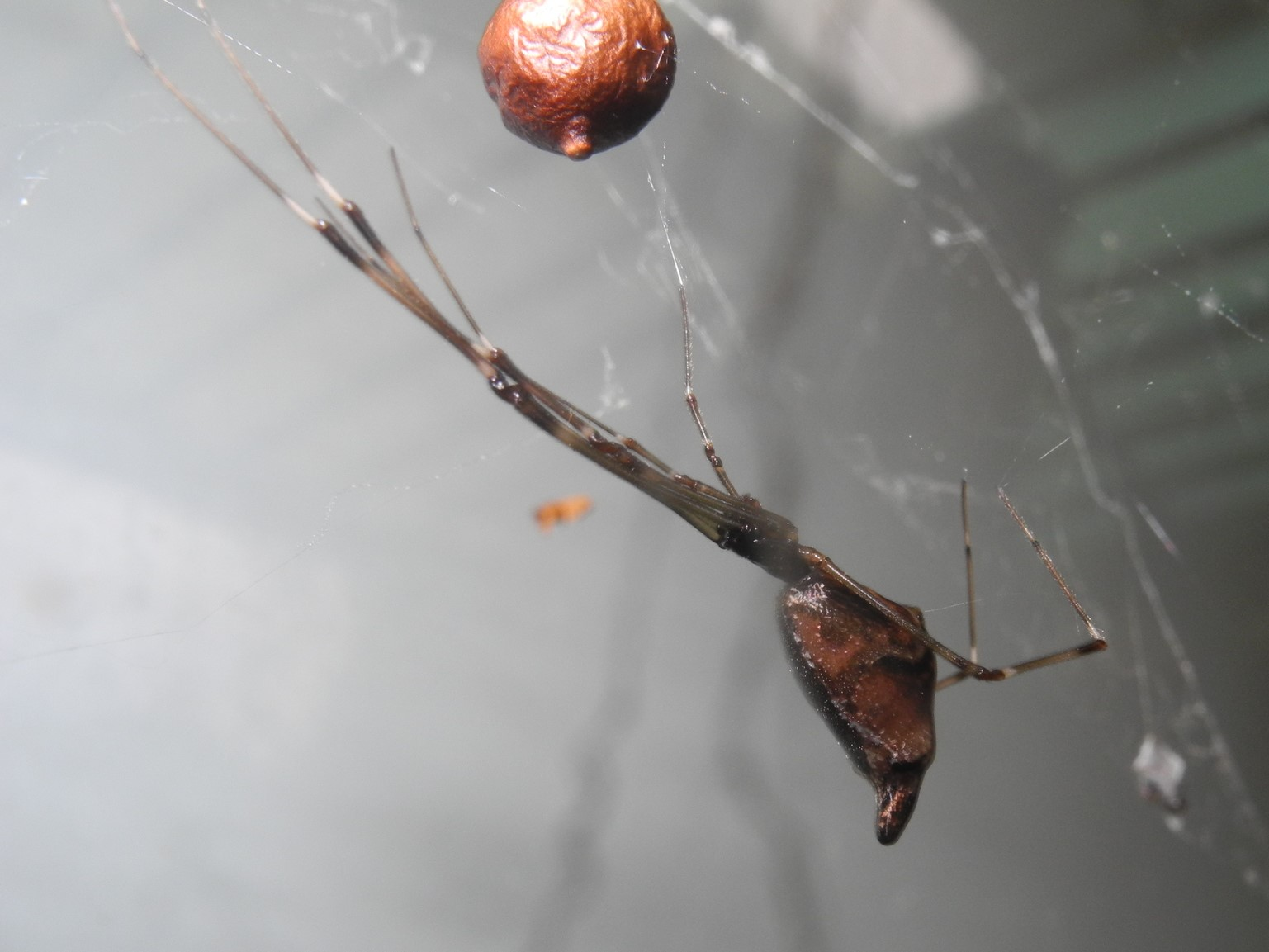
- female from Taiwan
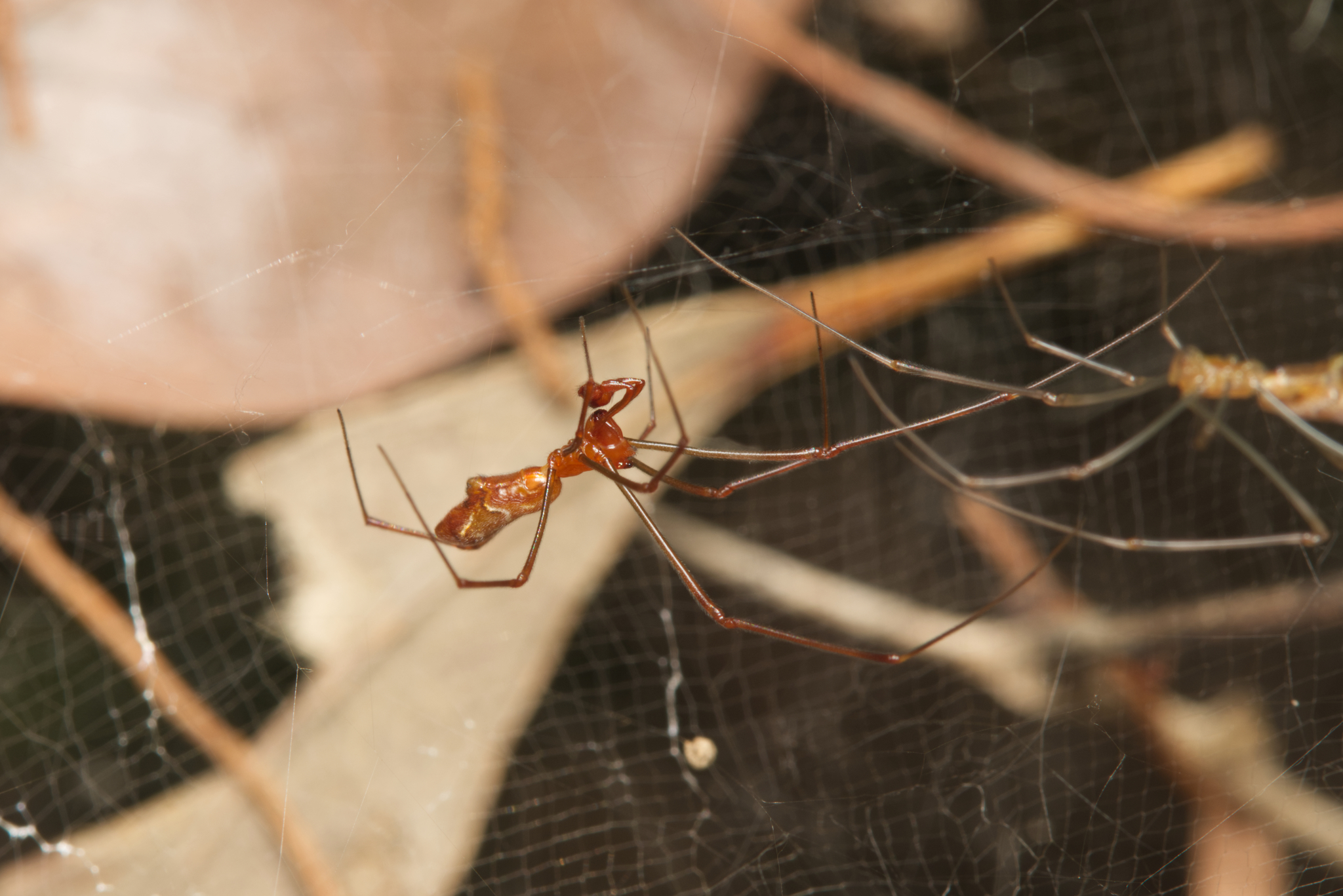
- male from Australia in Cyrtophora web

Scientific classification
- Kingdom: Animalia
- Phylum: Arthropoda
- Subphylum: Chelicerata
- Class: Arachnida
- Order: Araneae
- Infraorder: Araneomorphae
- Family: Theridiidae
- Genus: Argyrodes
- Species: A. fissifrons

Binomial name
- Argyrodes fissifrons O. Pickard-Cambridge, 1869

= Argyrodes fissifrons =

Split-faced silver spider

Species of spider

Argyrodes fissifrons, the split-faced silver spider, is a species of spider of the genus Argyrodes. It is found from Sri Lanka to China and Australia.

== Description ==
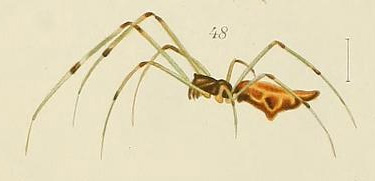
Diagnostic drawing of female

The female is larger than the male, at about 12mm in length. The abdomen is triangular, with the spinnerets pointing downwards and the hind-end pointing backwards. The body has silvery spots and has long and thin legs. The males have bumps on their head. After mating, male seals the epigyne of the female with a resin plug to inhibit further copulation.

== Ecology ==
A kleptoparasitic spider, it sometimes preys upon its host spider Agelena limbata, during or just after molting of the host. However, this species is much smaller than the host. Recently, scientists found that their association with Cyrtophora spider webs, from Orchid Island, of Taiwan. Scientists finally found that A. fissifrons scavenge on webs of Cyrtophora hosts by collecting small preys ignored by the hosts.

== Subspecies ==
- Argyrodes fissifrons fissifrons Thorell, 1891 - Sri Lanka to China and Australia
- Argyrodes fissifrons terressae Thorell, 1891 - Nicobar Islands
