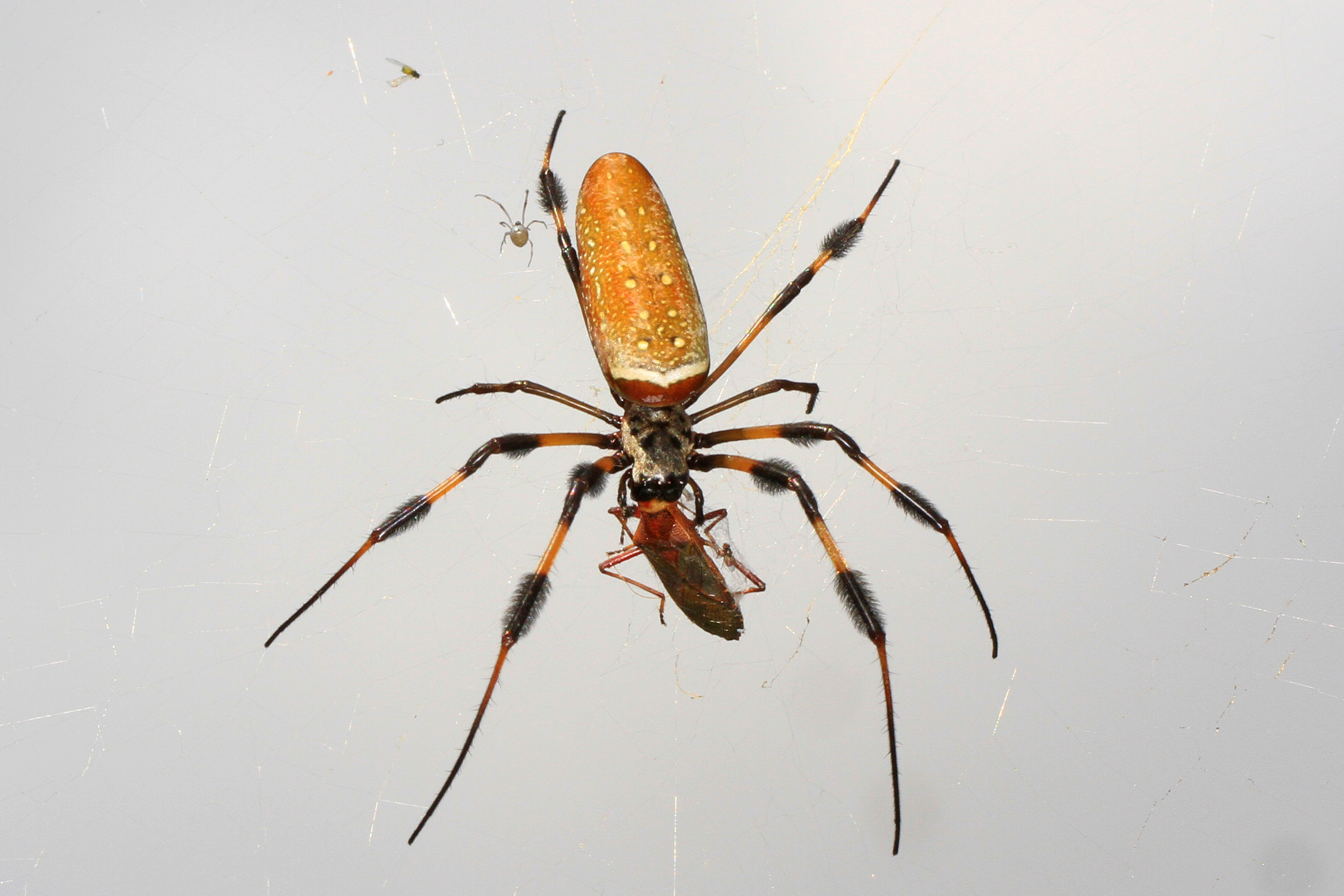

Scientific classification
- Domain: Eukaryota
- Kingdom: Animalia
- Phylum: Arthropoda
- Subphylum: Chelicerata
- Class: Arachnida
- Order: Araneae
- Infraorder: Araneomorphae
- Family: Theridiidae
- Genus: Argyrodes
- Species: A. nephilae

Binomial name
- Argyrodes nephilae Taczanowski, 1873

= Argyrodes nephilae =

Species of spider

Argyrodes nephilae is a species of cobweb spider in the family Theridiidae. It is found in a range from the United States to Argentina and the Galapagos Islands.
