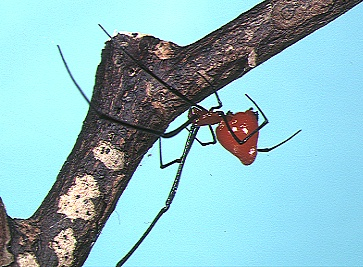
- female from Okinawa

Scientific classification
- Kingdom: Animalia
- Phylum: Arthropoda
- Subphylum: Chelicerata
- Class: Arachnida
- Order: Araneae
- Infraorder: Araneomorphae
- Family: Theridiidae
- Genus: Argyrodes
- Species: A. miniaceus

Binomial name
- Argyrodes miniaceus (Doleschall, 1857)

Synonyms
- Theridion miniaceum Doleschall, 1857; Argyrodes miniatus Thorell, 1881; Argyrodes walkeri Rainbow, 1902; Argyrodes musgravei Rainbow, 1916; Argyrodes miltosus Zhu & Song, 1991

= Argyrodes miniaceus =

Species of spider

Argyrodes miniaceus is a species of kleptoparasitic spider in the family Theridiidae. Originally described as Theridion miniaceum by Doleschall in 1857, it was transferred to the genus Argyrodes by Thorell in 1878.

== Distribution ==
A. miniaceus has a wide distribution across the Asia-Pacific region, ranging from India, Korea, and Japan to Australia. The species has been recorded from numerous countries including China, where it was initially misidentified as separate species A. miltosus.

== Description ==
A. miniaceus is a small spider with males measuring 3–4 mm and females 3–5.3 mm in body length. The cephalothorax ranges from testaceous to brownish-rufescent coloration. The legs are predominantly black with rufescent bases, while the first and fourth pairs are yellow-testaceous, with femora sometimes bearing rufescent rings.

The abdomen, when viewed laterally, appears sub-triangular and is positioned posteriorly high and erect. Coloration varies from gray to brownish-testaceous, sometimes appearing blackish, with characteristic markings including a small black spot at the posterior tip of the dorsum and black spots above the anus. The abdomen typically displays paired white spots or stripes on each side, positioned higher and more posteriorly.

Males exhibit distinctive head modifications, with the head being transversely cleft in front of the lateral eyes. This creates lobes that form an oval opening between them, with black hair above. The upper lobe is sub-conical and curved downward, bearing the median eyes, while the lower lobe is sub-conical or triangular with an obtuse apex that curves slightly upward.

== Ecology ==
A. miniaceus is a kleptoparasitic species, meaning it steals prey from other spiders' webs rather than building its own prey-capture webs. This behavioral strategy is characteristic of many Argyrodes species.

== Taxonomy ==
The taxonomic history of A. miniaceus has been complex, with several synonymizations occurring over time. Notable synonyms include A. walkeri Rainbow, 1902, which was synonymized by Berland in 1938, and A. musgravei Rainbow, 1916, which was synonymized by Grostal in 1999. The Chinese species A. miltosus, described by Zhu & Song in 1991, was later confirmed to be synonymous with A. miniaceus by Kim & Kim in 2007 and Yoshida in 2003.
