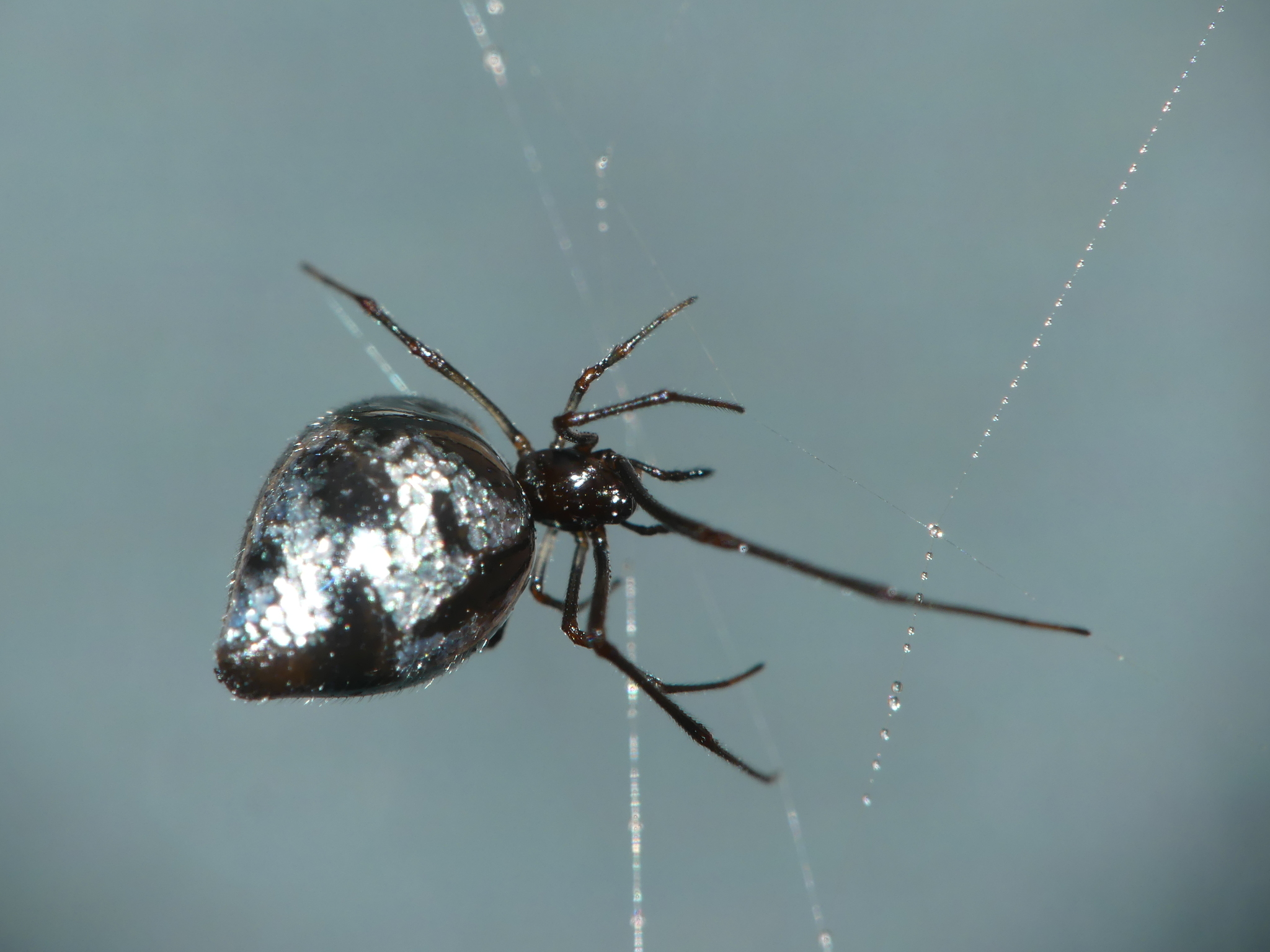
- Female from France
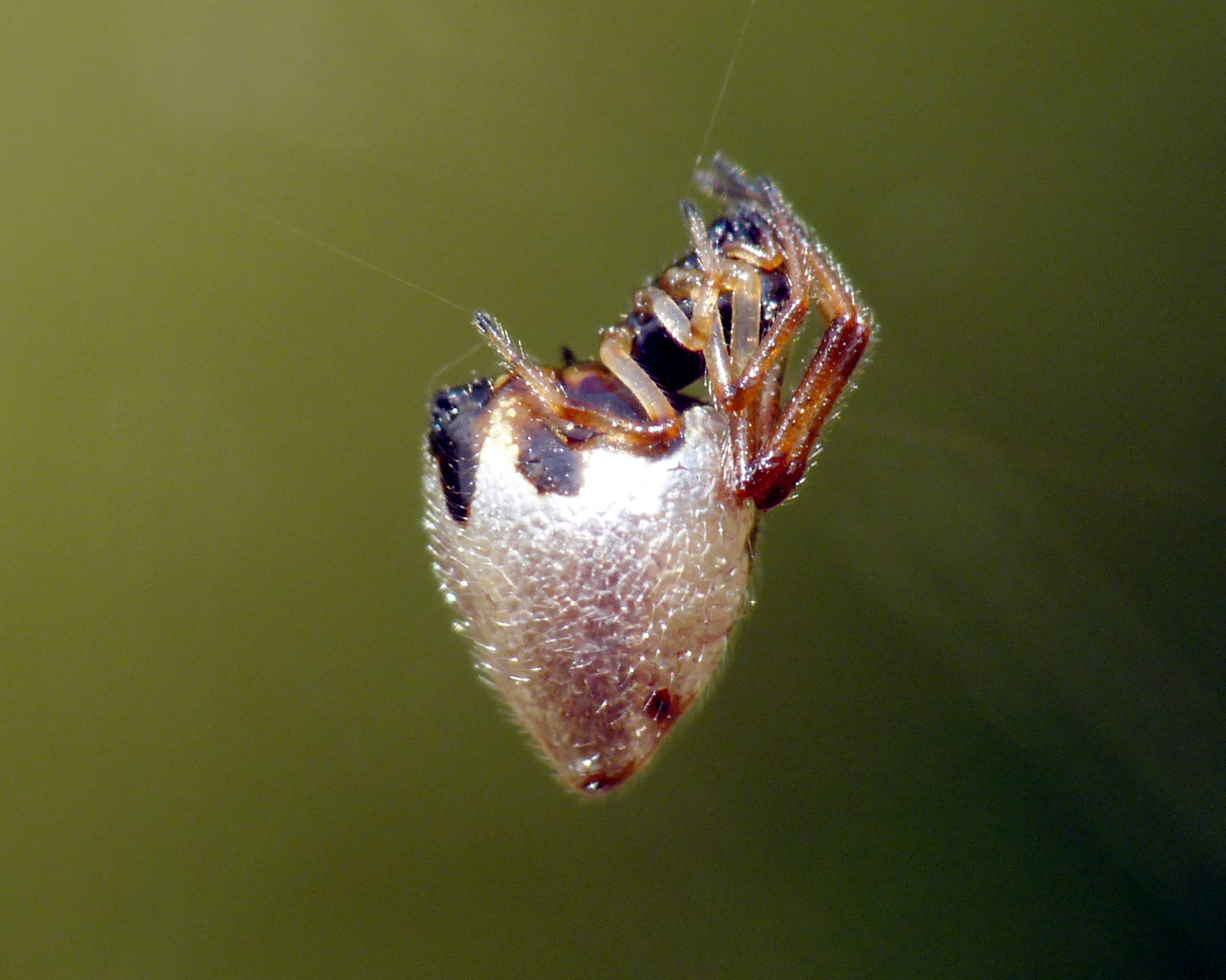
- Female from Italy

Scientific classification
- Kingdom: Animalia
- Phylum: Arthropoda
- Subphylum: Chelicerata
- Class: Arachnida
- Order: Araneae
- Infraorder: Araneomorphae
- Family: Theridiidae
- Genus: Argyrodes
- Species: A. argyrodes

Binomial name
- Argyrodes argyrodes (Walckenaer, 1841)

Synonyms
- Linyphia argyrodes Walckenaer, 1841; Linyphia gibbosa Lucas, 1846; Argyrodes epeirae Simon, 1866; Argyrodes gibbosus Simon, 1873; Argyrodina argyrodes Strand, 1928; Conopistha argyrodes Exline, 1945; Argyrodes ammonia Denis, 1947

= Argyrodes argyrodes =

Species of spider

Argyrodes argyrodes is a species of spider in the family Theridiidae.

== Distribution ==
Argyrodes argyrodes is found throughout the Mediterranean region and West Africa. It has been introduced to St. Helena, Seychelles, and Hawaii.

In South Africa, this introduced species is recorded from the provinces Eastern Cape, Gauteng, and KwaZulu-Natal. Locations include Seekoeivlei, Roodeplaatdam Nature Reserve, Pretoria/Tshwane, Tswaing Nature Reserve, and Hluhluwe Nature Reserve.

== Description ==
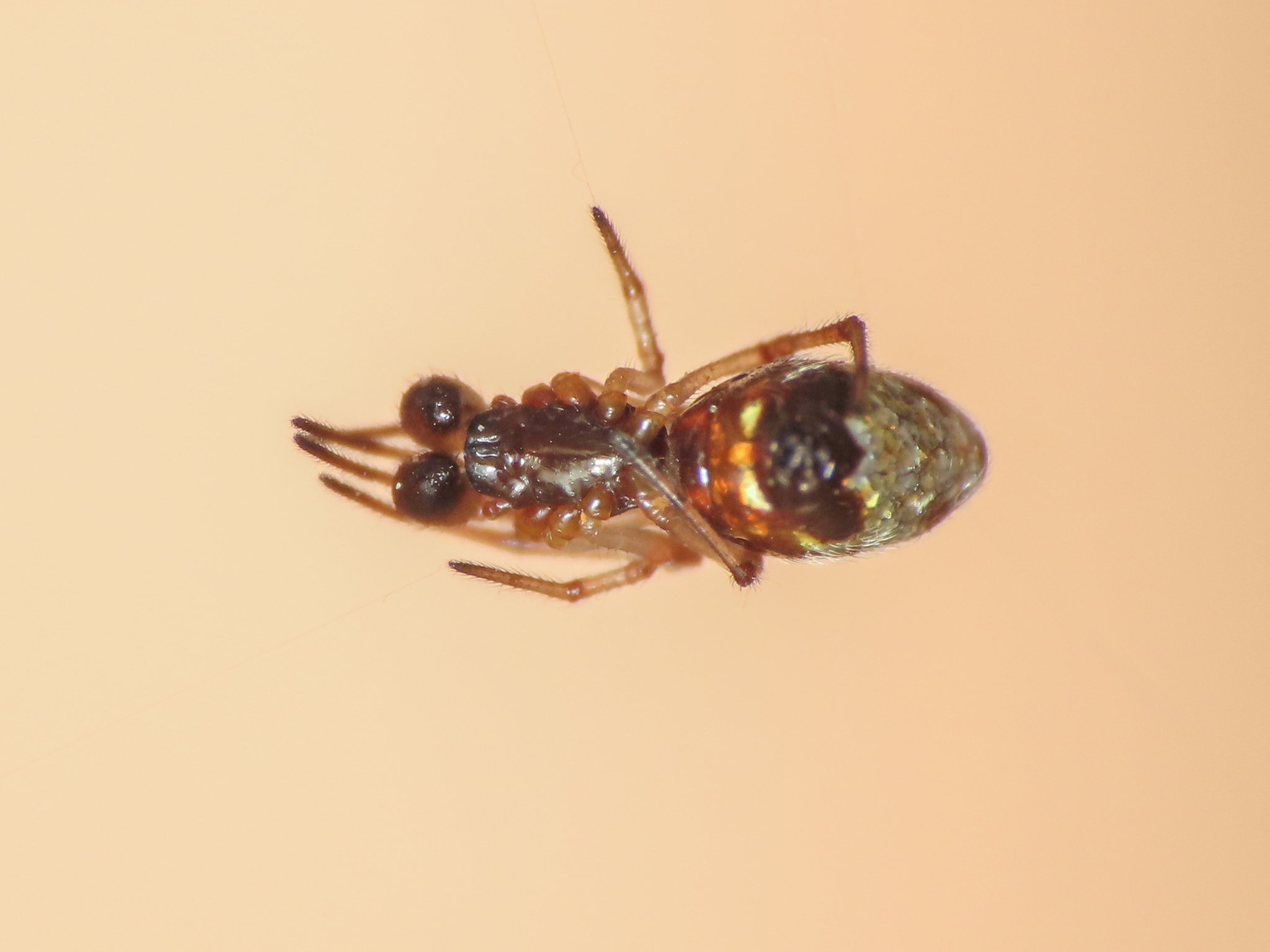
male

== Habitat and ecology ==
These spiders are kleptoparasites, usually found on the webs of other spiders. They steal prey from the webs of other spiders. Only a few spiders from this genus catch prey in their own webs.

The species has been sampled at altitudes ranging from 1247 to 1303 m in South Africa.

== Conservation ==
Argyrodes argyrodes is listed as Least Concern by the South African National Biodiversity Institute due to its wide range. The species has a wide distribution and there are no significant threats to this species. It is undersampled in South Africa.

== Taxonomy ==
Argyrodes argyrodes was originally described by Walckenaer in 1841 as Linyphia argyrodes. The species is known from both sexes.
