= Argyrodes insectus =

Scientific classification
- Domain: Eukaryota
- Kingdom: Animalia
- Phylum: Arthropoda
- Subphylum: Chelicerata
- Class: Arachnida
- Order: Araneae
- Infraorder: Araneomorphae
- Family: Theridiidae
- Genus: Argyrodes
- Species: A. insectus

Binomial name
- Argyrodes insectus Schmidt, 2005

Species of spider

Argyrodes insectus is a species of spiders of the family Theridiidae that is endemic in Cape Verde. The species was first described by Günter E. W. Schmidt in 2005.
