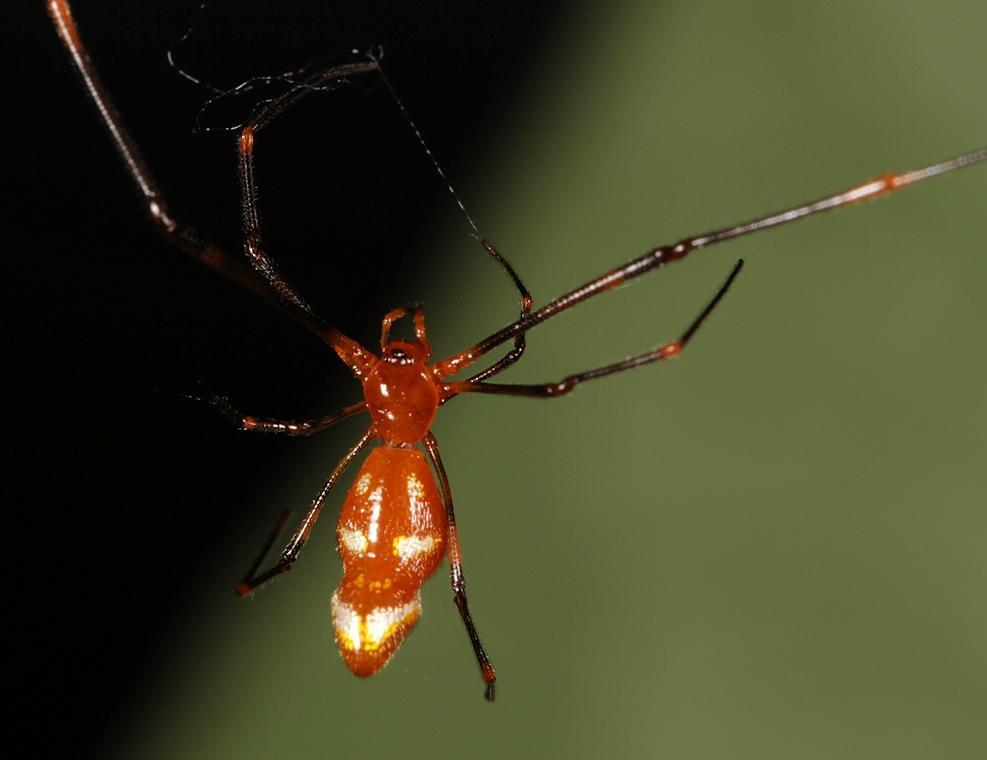
- on Nephila fenestrata web
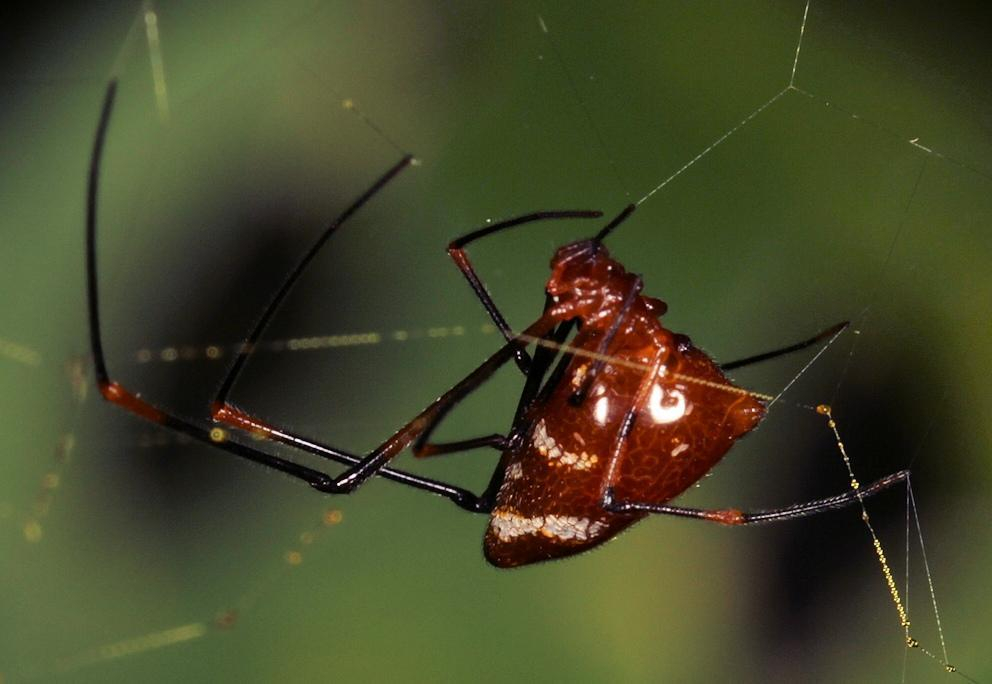

Scientific classification
- Kingdom: Animalia
- Phylum: Arthropoda
- Subphylum: Chelicerata
- Class: Arachnida
- Order: Araneae
- Infraorder: Araneomorphae
- Family: Theridiidae
- Genus: Argyrodes
- Species: A. convivans

Binomial name
- Argyrodes convivans Lawrence, 1937

= Argyrodes convivans =

Kosibay Argyrodes Dew-Drop Spider

Species of spider

Argyrodes convivans is a species of spider in the family Theridiidae. It is commonly known as the Kosibay Argyrodes dew-drop spider.

== Distribution ==
Argyrodes convivans is found in Zimbabwe and South Africa.

In South Africa, it is recorded from the provinces Eastern Cape, KwaZulu-Natal, Limpopo, Mpumalanga, Northern Cape, and Western Cape.

== Description ==
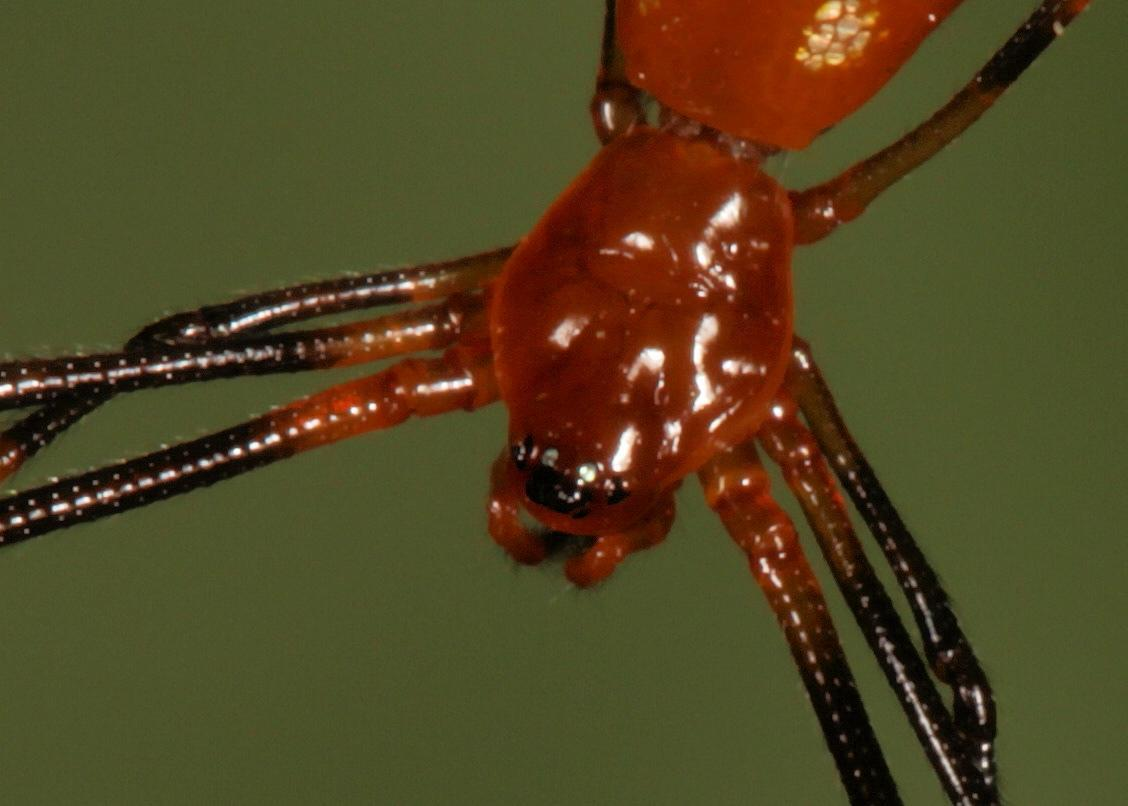

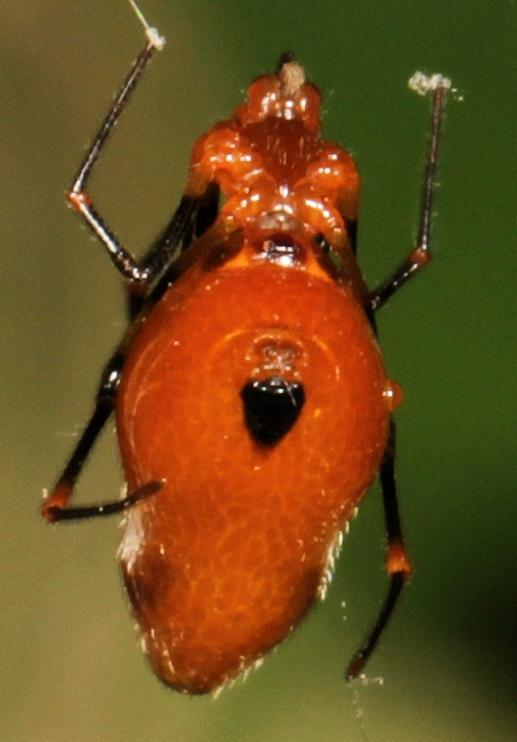

The upper surface of the abdomen is yellow, brownish at the sides, with a round blackish spot at the posterior apex. There is a black spot on each side of the spinnerets.

== Habitat and ecology ==
These spiders are kleptoparasites. This species steals prey from the webs of other spiders. Only a few spiders from this genus catch prey in their own webs. This species was sampled from orb-webs of other spiders. It was sampled from the Forest, Fynbos, and Savanna biomes. The species was also sampled from citrus orchards and cotton.

Argyrodes convivans has been sampled at altitudes ranging from 29 to 1341 m.

A. stridulator and A. convivans have a stridulating organ consisting of two ridged, oval patches on the carapace that are scraped against a chitinous ring on the anterior apex of the abdomen.

== Conservation ==
Argyrodes convivans is listed as Least Concern by the South African National Biodiversity Institute due to its wide geographical range. There are no significant threats to this species. It is protected in more than ten protected areas.

== Taxonomy ==
Argyrodes convivans was described by Lawrence in 1937 from Kosi Bay Nature Reserve, KwaZulu-Natal. The species is known from both sexes.
