= Spheropistha nigroris =

Scientific classification
- Kingdom: Animalia
- Phylum: Arthropoda
- Subphylum: Chelicerata
- Class: Arachnida
- Order: Araneae
- Infraorder: Araneomorphae
- Family: Theridiidae
- Genus: Spheropistha
- Species: S. nigroris

Binomial name
- Spheropistha nigroris (Yoshida, Tso & Severinghaus, 2000)
- Spheropistha nigroris is known from Orchid Island, Taiwan

Synonyms
- Argyrodes nigroris Yoshida, Tso & Severinghaus, 2000

Species of spider

Spheropistha nigroris is a species of comb-footed spider in the family Theridiidae. It is endemic to Taiwan. The type series – the holotype male and three females – was collected from Orchid Island.

Male Spheropistha nigroris measures 1.95 mm (0.1 in) and females measure 2.21–4.37 mm (0.1–0.2 in) in total length. Basal color is black. The abdomen bears a pair of small grayish flecks. The femora are yellowish brown. Metatarsi and tarsi are brown.
