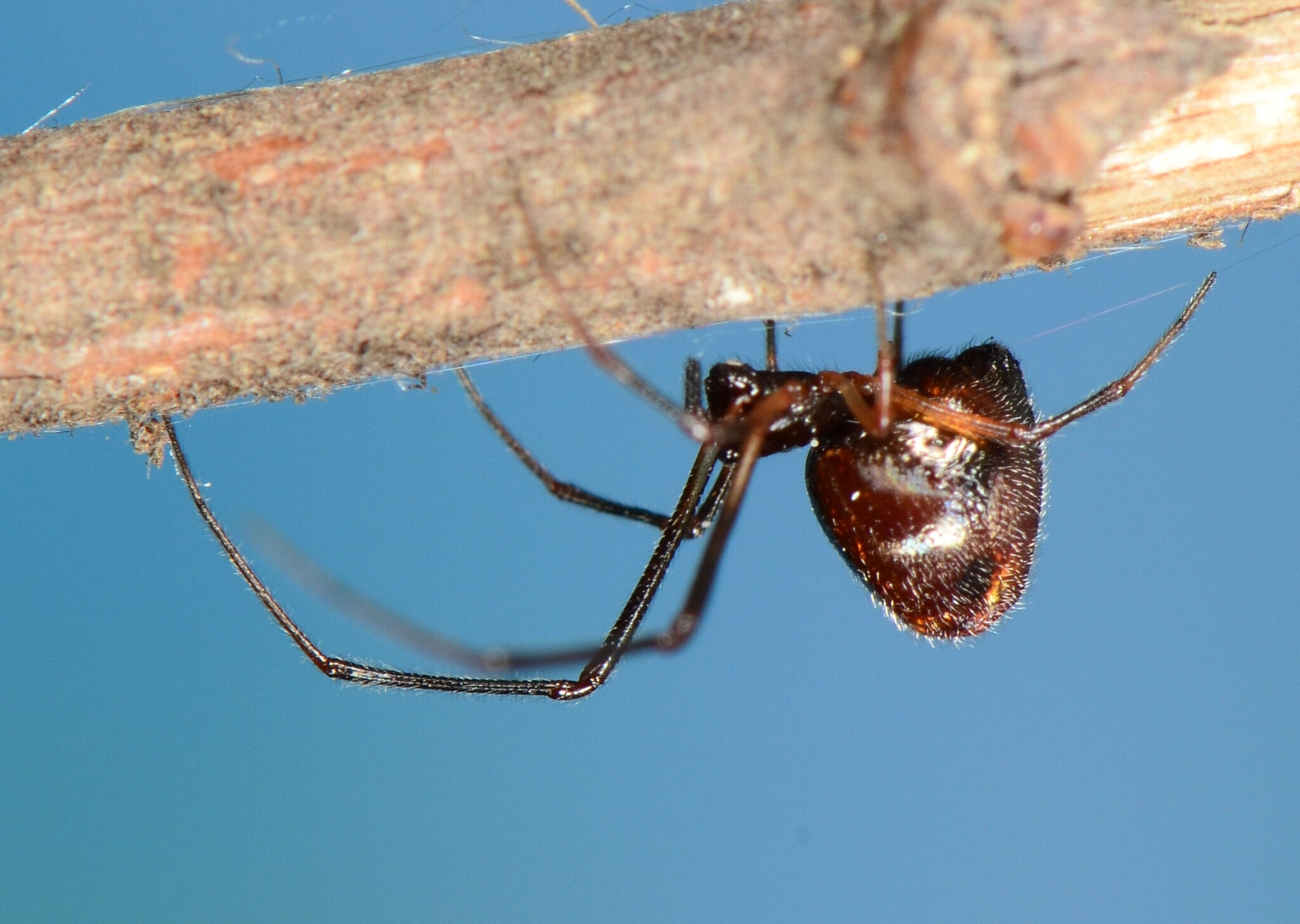
- Female
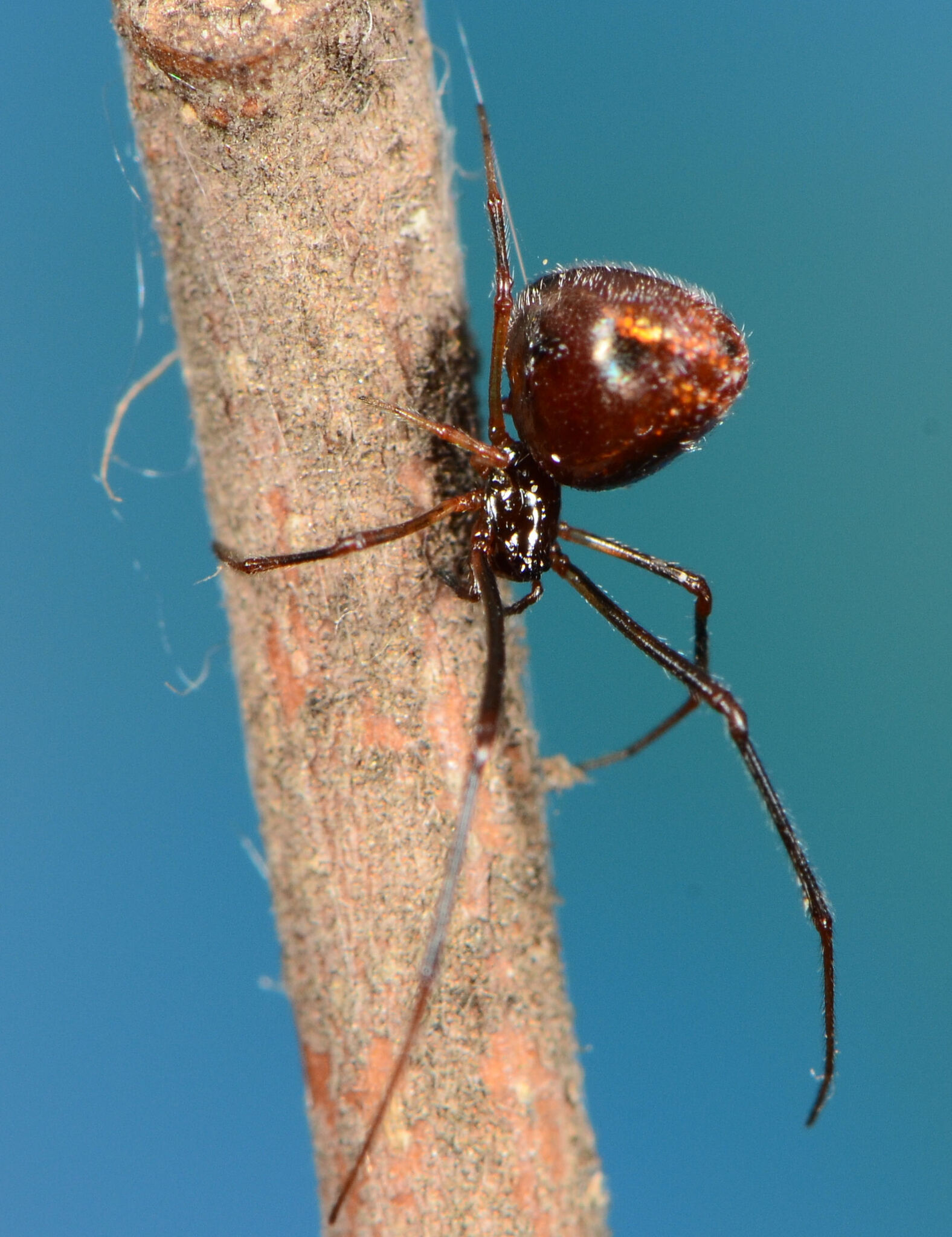
- Female

Scientific classification
- Kingdom: Animalia
- Phylum: Arthropoda
- Subphylum: Chelicerata
- Class: Arachnida
- Order: Araneae
- Infraorder: Araneomorphae
- Family: Theridiidae
- Genus: Argyrodes
- Species: A. zonatus

Binomial name
- Argyrodes zonatus (Walckenaer, 1841)

Synonyms
- Linyphia zonata Walckenaer, 1841; Linyphia parasita Vinson, 1863

= Argyrodes zonatus =

Silver Argyrodes Dew-Drop Spider

Species of spider

Argyrodes zonatus is a species of spider in the family Theridiidae. It is commonly known as the silver argyrodes dew-drop spider.

== Distribution ==
Argyrodes zonatus is found in Equatorial Guinea (Bioko), East Africa, Eswatini, Madagascar, Réunion, Mayotte, and South Africa.

In South Africa, it is known from the provinces Eastern Cape, Gauteng, Limpopo, Mpumalanga, and Western Cape.

== Description ==
The cephalothorax is pale fawn veined with brown. The abdomen is creamy white, except for the plates covering the lungs, which are brown, and the epigyne, which is fawn to very dark red. On the abdomen, there are a few elongated black spots: one on the belly touching the spinnerets, another on the posterior surface of the abdomen, on each side a few spots of the same nature, one closer to the spinnerets, one closer to the top, one towards the middle of the back, a few other spots near the last ones, and formed of silver plates.

== Habitat and ecology ==
Spiders in this genus are generally kleptoparasites. Argyrodes zonatus species steals prey from the webs of other spiders. Only a few spiders from this genus catch prey in their own webs. This species was sampled from orb-webs of other spiders. It was sampled from the Fynbos, Savanna, and Thicket biomes, at altitudes ranging from 228 to 1535 m.

== Conservation ==
Argyrodes zonatus is listed as Least Concern by the South African National Biodiversity Institute due to its wide geographical range. There are no significant threats to this species. It is sampled from eight protected areas.

== Taxonomy ==
Argyrodes zonatus was originally described by Walckenaer in 1841 as Linyphia zonata. The species is known from both sexes.
