= Argyrodella =

Conservation status
- Vulnerable (IUCN 3.1)

Scientific classification
- Kingdom: Animalia
- Phylum: Arthropoda
- Subphylum: Chelicerata
- Class: Arachnida
- Order: Araneae
- Infraorder: Araneomorphae
- Family: Theridiidae
- Genus: Argyrodella; Saaristo, 2006
- Species: A. pusillus

Binomial name
- Argyrodella pusillus (Saaristo, 1978)

Genus of spiders

Argyrodella is a monotypic genus of Seychelloise comb-footed spiders containing the single species, Argyrodella pusillus. It was first described by Michael I. Saaristo in 2006, and is found on the Seychelles.

It is endemic to the Seychelles, and can be found on the islands of Mahé and Silhouette. It lives in woodland habitats, where it spins orb webs or is a kleptoparasite of the red-legged golden orb-web spider. It is threatened by habitat deterioration due to invasive plants, especially Cinnamomum verum.
