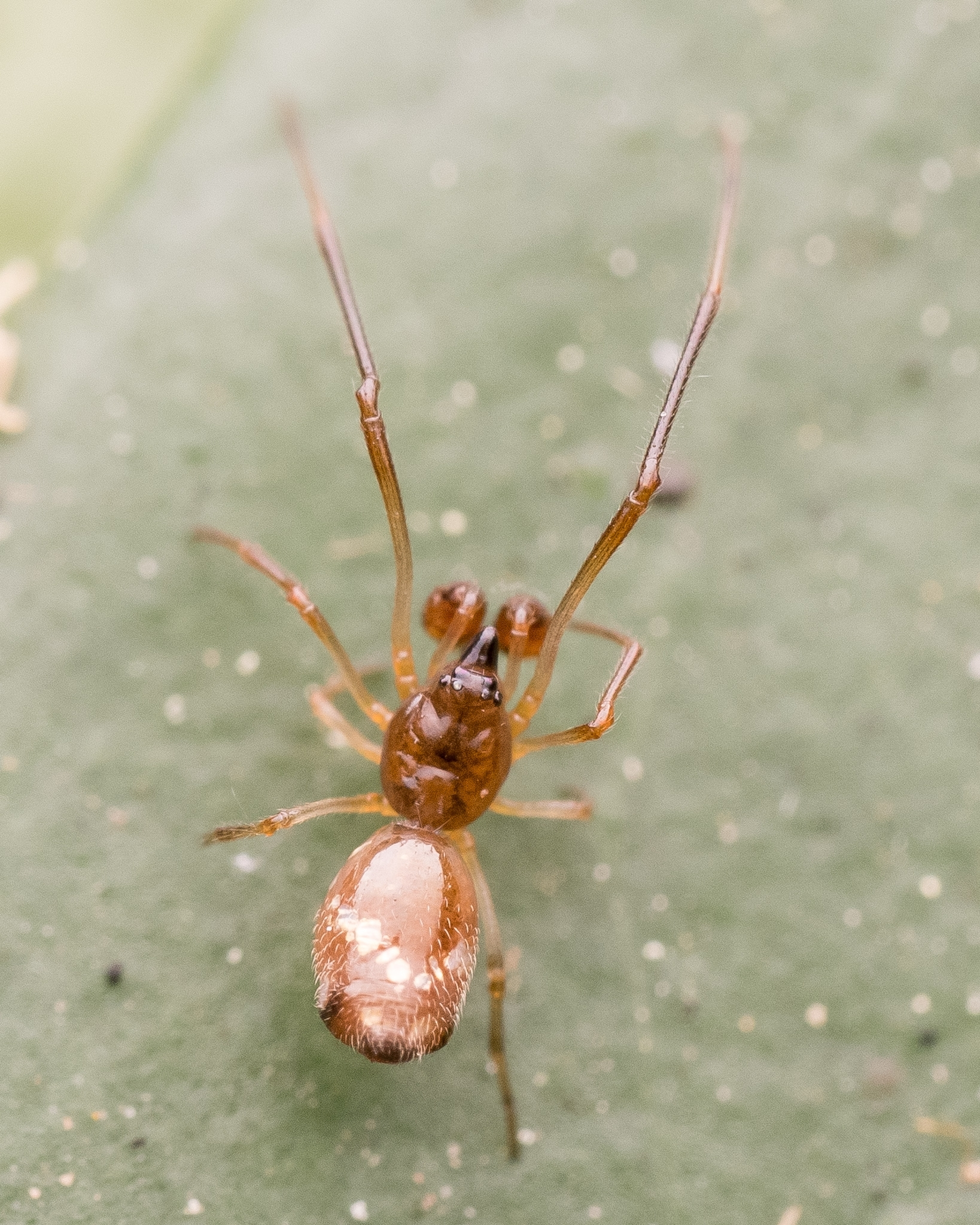
- male R. xiphias in Hong Kong

Scientific classification
- Kingdom: Animalia
- Phylum: Arthropoda
- Subphylum: Chelicerata
- Class: Arachnida
- Order: Araneae
- Infraorder: Araneomorphae
- Family: Theridiidae
- Genus: Rhinocosmetus; Vanuytven, Jocqué & Deeleman-Reinhold, 2024

Type species
- R. argentatus Vanuytven, Jocqué & Deeleman-Reinhold, 2024

Species
- 17, see text

= Rhinocosmetus =

Genus of spiders

Rhinocosmetus is a genus of spiders in the family Theridiidae.

== Distribution ==
Rhinocosmetus is distributed throughout Southeast Asia and adjacent regions.

== Etymology ==
The genus name is a combination of Ancient Greek ρινος (nose) and κοσμετος (decorated).

== Species ==
As of January 2026, this genus includes seventeen species:

- Rhinocosmetus argentatus Vanuytven, Jocqué & Deeleman-Reinhold, 2024 – Malaysia (Borneo)
- Rhinocosmetus atropyga Vanuytven, Jocqué & Deeleman-Reinhold, 2024 – Indonesia (Sulawesi)
- Rhinocosmetus carnicobarensis (Tikader, 1977) – India (Nicobar Is.)
- Rhinocosmetus cochleatus Vanuytven, Jocqué & Deeleman-Reinhold, 2024 – Indonesia (Java)
- Rhinocosmetus djojosudharmoi Vanuytven, Jocqué & Deeleman-Reinhold, 2024 – Indonesia (Lesser Sunda Is.)
- Rhinocosmetus dolichogaster Vanuytven, Jocqué & Deeleman-Reinhold, 2024 – Indonesia (Lesser Sunda Is.)
- Rhinocosmetus dolichorhinus Vanuytven, Jocqué & Deeleman-Reinhold, 2024 – Thailand, Indonesia (Bali)
- Rhinocosmetus gretathunbergae Vanuytven, Jocqué & Deeleman-Reinhold, 2024 – Malaysia (Borneo), Indonesia (Sumatra, Borneo)
- Rhinocosmetus gunungleuser Vanuytven, Jocqué & Deeleman-Reinhold, 2024 – Indonesia (Sumatra)
- Rhinocosmetus lombok Vanuytven, Jocqué & Deeleman-Reinhold, 2024 – Indonesia (Lesser Sunda Is.)
- Rhinocosmetus megarhinus Vanuytven, Jocqué & Deeleman-Reinhold, 2024 – Indonesia (Bali, Lesser Sunda Is.)
- Rhinocosmetus nasicornis Vanuytven, Jocqué & Deeleman-Reinhold, 2024 – Malaysia (Borneo)
- Rhinocosmetus nasutus (O. Pickard-Cambridge, 1880) – Sri Lanka
- Rhinocosmetus pinocchio Vanuytven, Jocqué & Deeleman-Reinhold, 2024 – Indonesia (Bali)
- Rhinocosmetus skoliorhinus Vanuytven, Jocqué & Deeleman-Reinhold, 2024 – Indonesia (Sumatra)
- Rhinocosmetus sumba Vanuytven, Jocqué & Deeleman-Reinhold, 2024 – Indonesia (Lesser Sunda Is.)
- Rhinocosmetus xiphias (Thorell, 1887) – China, Myanmar, Thailand, Laos, Cambodia, Indonesia (Borneo, Krakatau?), Japan? Taiwan?
