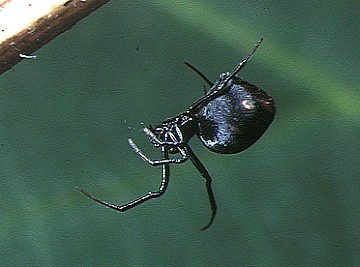
- Female Spheropistha melanosoma

Scientific classification
- Kingdom: Animalia
- Phylum: Arthropoda
- Subphylum: Chelicerata
- Class: Arachnida
- Order: Araneae
- Infraorder: Araneomorphae
- Family: Theridiidae
- Genus: Spheropistha; Yaginuma, 1957

Type species
- S. melanosoma Yaginuma, 1957

Species
- 7, see text

= Spheropistha =

Genus of spiders

Spheropistha is a genus of Asian comb-footed spiders that was first described by T. Yaginuma in 1957.

== Species ==
As of June 2020 it contains seven species, found in Taiwan, Japan, and China:

- Spheropistha huangsangensis (Yin, Peng & Bao, 2004) – China
- Spheropistha melanosoma Yaginuma, 1957 (type) – Japan, Korea?
- Spheropistha miyashitai (Tanikawa, 1998) – Japan
- Spheropistha nigroris (Yoshida, Tso & Severinghaus, 2000) – Taiwan
- Spheropistha orbita (Zhu, 1998) – China
- Spheropistha rhomboides (Yin, Peng & Bao, 2004) – China
- Spheropistha xinhua Barrion, Barrion-Dupo & Heong, 2013 – China
