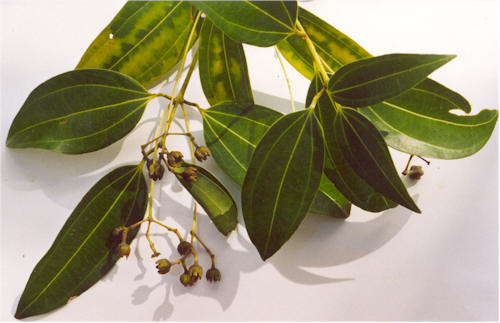
- Cinnamomum verum foliage and flowers

Conservation status
- Vulnerable (IUCN 3.1)

Scientific classification
- Kingdom: Plantae
- Clade: Tracheophytes
- Clade: Angiosperms
- Clade: Magnoliids
- Order: Laurales
- Family: Lauraceae
- Genus: Cinnamomum
- Species: C. verum

Binomial name
- Cinnamomum verum J.Presl

Synonyms
- Camphorina cinnamomum (L.) Farw.; Cinnamomum alexei Kosterm.; Cinnamomum aromaticum J.Graham; Cinnamomum barthii Lukman.; Cinnamomum bengalense Lukman.; Cinnamomum biafranum Lukman.; Cinnamomum bonplandii Lukman.; Cinnamomum boutonii Lukman.; Cinnamomum capense Lukman.; Cinnamomum cayennense Lukman.; Cinnamomum cinnamomum (L.) H.Karst., nom. inval.; Cinnamomum commersonii Lukman.; Cinnamomum cordifolium Lukman.; Cinnamomum decandollei Lukman.; Cinnamomum delessertii Lukman.; Cinnamomum ellipticum Lukman.; Cinnamomum erectum Lukman.; Cinnamomum humboldtii Lukman.; Cinnamomum iners Wight, nom. illeg.; Cinnamomum karrouwa Lukman.; Cinnamomum leptopus A.C.Sm.; Cinnamomum leschenaultii Lukman.; Cinnamomum madrassicum Lukman.; Cinnamomum maheanum Lukman.; Cinnamomum mauritianum Lukman.; Cinnamomum meissneri Lukman.; Cinnamomum ovatum Lukman.; Cinnamomum pallasii Lukman.; Cinnamomum pleei Lukman.; Cinnamomum pourretii Lukman.; Cinnamomum regelii Lukman.; Cinnamomum roxburghii Lukman.; Cinnamomum sieberi Lukman.; Cinnamomum sonneratii Lukman.; Cinnamomum vaillantii Lukman.; Cinnamomum variabile Lukman.; Cinnamomum wolkensteinii Lukman.; Cinnamomum zeylanicum Blume; Cinnamomum zollingeri Lukman.; Laurus cinnamomum L.

= Cinnamomum verum =

Species of tree

Cinnamomum verum (synonym Cinnamomum zeylanicum), also known as true cinnamon or Ceylon cinnamon, is a small evergreen tree belonging to the family Lauraceae, native to Sri Lanka. The inner bark of the tree is historically regarded as the spice cinnamon, though this name has also been used for C. cassia (cassia) as well.

== Description ==
Cinnamomum verum is an evergreen tree growing to 10–15 m (30–50 ft) tall. The leaves are ovate-oblong in shape and 7–18 cm (3–7 in) long. The flowers, which are arranged in panicles, are greenish and have a distinct scent. The fruit is a purple 1 cm (0.5 in) drupe containing a single seed.

== Cultivation ==
The old botanical synonym for the tree, Cinnamomum zeylanicum, is derived from Sri Lanka's former name, Ceylon. Sri Lanka still produces 80–90% of the world's supply of C. verum; it is also cultivated on a commercial scale in the Seychelles, Madagascar and Tanzania.

On Borneo, Cinnamomum verum is cultivated at low elevations in Sarawak (Kuching District), Sabah (Keningau and Sandakan districts), and Kalimantan.

=== Cultivars ===
There are several different cultivars of Cinnamomum verum based on the taste of bark:

- Pani-Miris Kurundu - Sweet and spicy
- Miris Kurundu - Spicy
- Sewala Kurundu - Smooth
- Weli Kurundu - Coarse
- Thiththa Kurundu - Bitter

== Processing ==
In cultivation, the trees are grown as leafy bushes, usually reaching a maximum of 3 m (10 ft) in height. They are first harvested at 3 years old and continue producing well for 40–50 years. Small side branches, 1.5–5 cm (0.59–1.97 in) in diameter, are removed from the trees. The outer bark is removed and processed into mulch. The twigs, leaves and berries (seeds) are crushed to make cinnamon oil, a less valuable byproduct. The inner bark of the branches is loosened by being rubbed with a brass rod. The bark is then split with a brass or stainless steel knife and peeled off as intact as possible. Long, full 'quills' of cinnamon are more valuable than broken pieces. These quills are then dried over several days in the shade, then in darkness. All this work is done by hand by experienced workers; this is the most expensive part of producing cinnamon spice. Finally, the dried bark is cut into sticks or ground into powder for sale to consumers.

== Grading ==
The Sri Lankan grading system divides the cinnamon quills into four groups:

- Alba, less than 6 mm (0.24 in) in diameter
- Continental, less than 16 mm (0.63 in) in diameter
- Mexican, less than 19 mm (0.75 in) in diameter
- Hamburg, less than 32 mm (1.3 in) in diameter

These groups are further divided into specific grades. For example, Mexican is divided into M00000 special, M000000 and M0000, depending on quill diameter and number of quills per kilogram. Any pieces of bark less than 106 mm (4.2 in) long are sold as quillings. Featherings are the inner bark of twigs and twisted shoots. Chips are trimmings of quills, outer and inner bark that cannot be separated, or the bark of small twigs.

== Medicinal uses ==
Cinnamon has a long history of use in traditional medicine as a digestive aid.

Preliminary studies show that cinnamon could slow symptoms of Alzheimer's disease through the reduction of the oligomerisation of beta-amyloid.

== Gallery ==
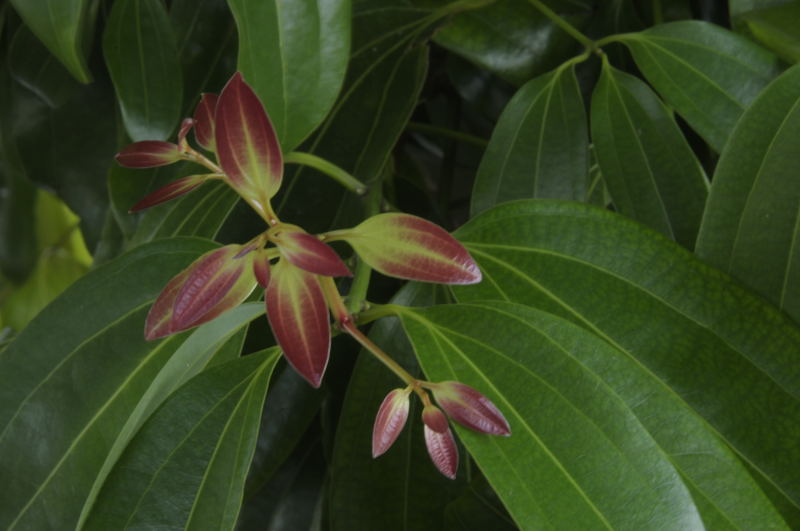
Leaves of the Cinnamomum verum plant

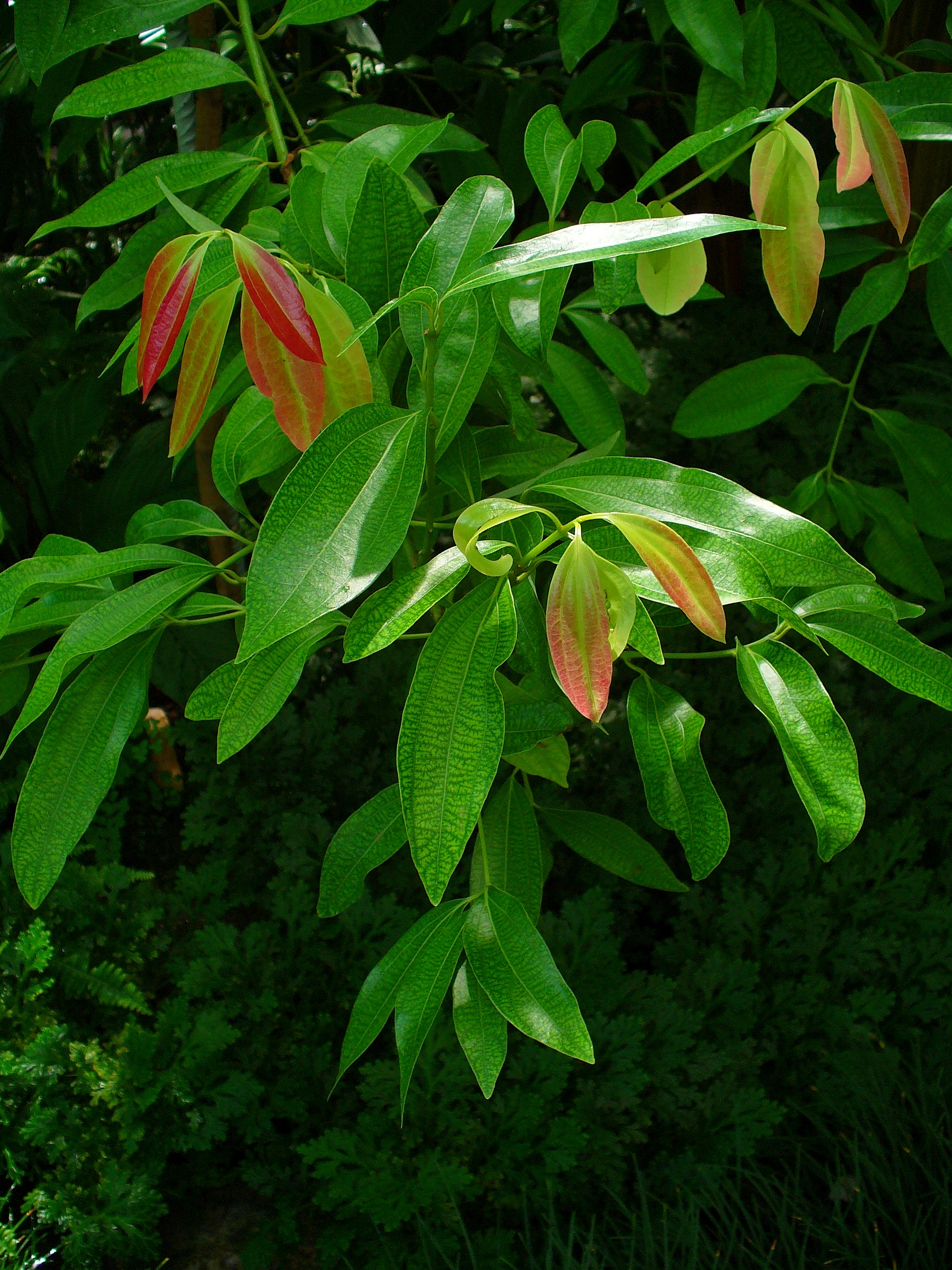
Leaves of the Cinnamomum verum plant

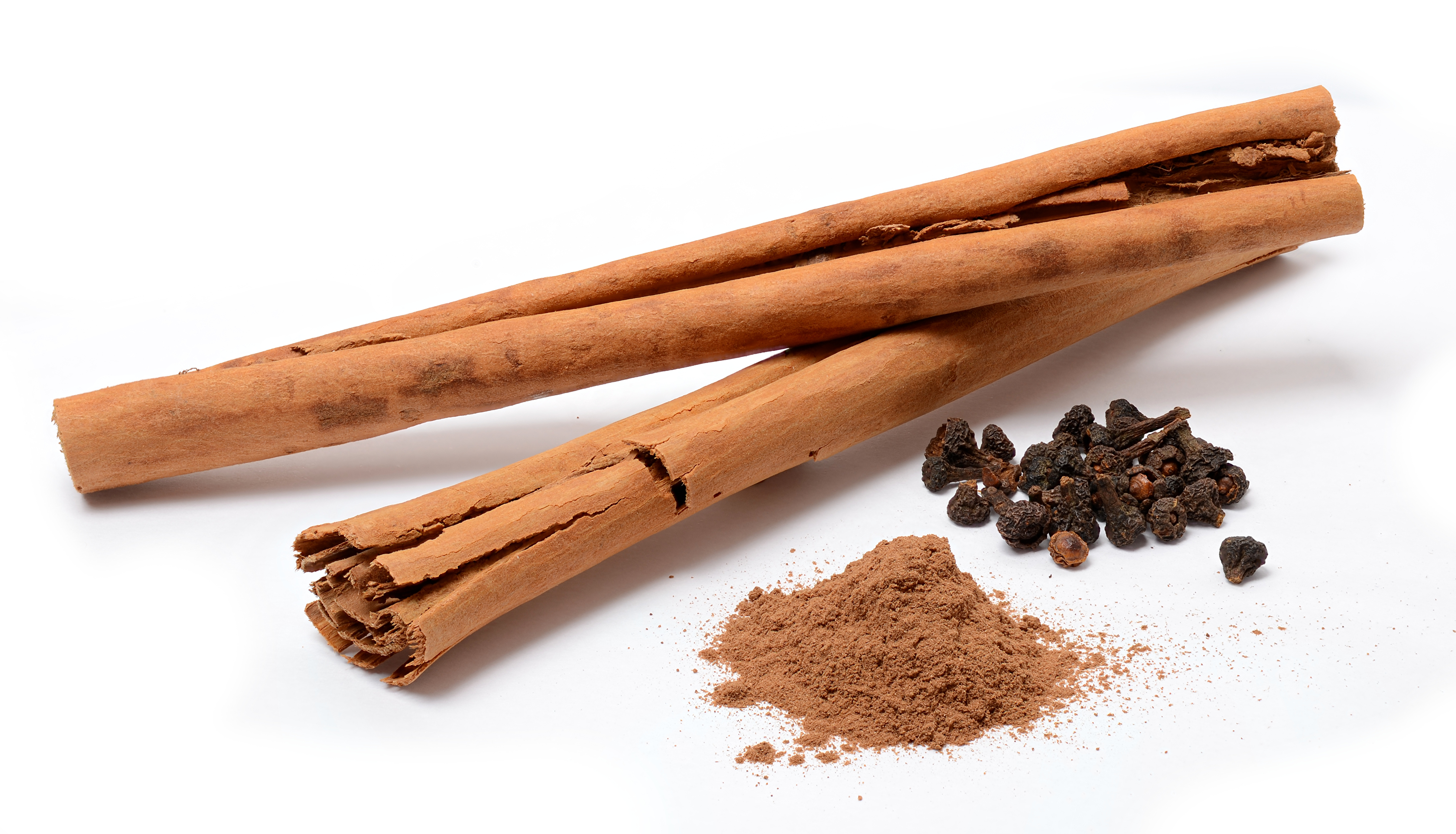
Bark, powder and dried flowers from Cinnamomum verum plant
