= Index of French Polynesia–related articles =

This page list topics related to French Polynesia.

== A ==
- Acteon Group
- Administrative divisions of French Polynesia
- Ahe
- Ahe Airport
- Ahunui
- Ahurei
- Aia Api
- Air Moorea
- Air Moorea Flight 1121
- Air Tahiti
- Air Tahiti Nui
- Air Tetiaroa
- Akamaru Island
- Akiaki
- Amanu
- Anaa
- Anaa Airport
- Angakauitai
- Anuanuraro
- Anuanurunga
- Apataki
- Apataki Airport
- Apou
- Aratika
- Arue, French Polynesia
- Arutua
- Arutua Airport
- A.S. Central Sport
- A.S. Dragon (Tahiti)
- A.S. Tefana
- Assembly of French Polynesia
- Atumata
- Atuona
- Atuona Bay
- Atuona Airport
- Aukena
- Austral Islands
- Austral language
- Avatika
- Avatoru
- Avatoru Pass

== B ==
- Bass Islands (French Polynesia)
- Billabong Pro Teahupoo
- Billabong Pro Teahupoo 2015
- Billabong Pro Teahupoo 2016
- Bora Bora
- Bora Bora Airport
- Bora Bora Commune
- Bora Bora Island

== C ==
- Calvary Cemetery (Atuona)
- CFP franc
- Christian Church in French Polynesia
- The Church of Jesus Christ of Latter-day Saints in French Polynesia
- Coat of arms of French Polynesia
- Communications in French Polynesia
- Conseil du Scoutisme polynésien

== D ==
- Demographics of French Polynesia
- La Dépêche de Tahiti
- Disappointment Islands
- Duke of Gloucester Islands

== E ==
- Economy of French Polynesia
- Eiao
- Eiao Island Nature Reserve
- Elections in French Polynesia

== F ==
- Faaa
- Fa'a'ā International Airport
- Fa'ahia
- Faaite
- Faaite Airport
- Fakahina
- Fakarava
- Fakarava Airport
- Fakarava (commune)
- Fangatau
- Fangatau Airport
- Fangataufa
- Fatu Hiva
- Fatu Huku
- Fautaua Valley
- Fetia Api
- Flag of French Polynesia
- Flag of the Austral Islands
- Flag of the Gambier Islands
- Football in Tahiti
- Four Seasons Resort Bora Bora
- Franco-Tahitian War
- French Polynesia at the 2013 World Aquatics Championships
- French Polynesia at the 2009 World Championships in Athletics
- French Polynesia at the 2011 World Championships in Athletics
- French Polynesia at the 2013 World Championships in Athletics
- French Polynesia at the 2015 World Championships in Athletics
- French Polynesia at the 2017 World Championships in Athletics
- French Polynesia men's national junior handball team
- French Polynesia's 1st constituency
- French Polynesian Americans
- French Polynesian franc
- 2004 French Polynesian legislative election
- 2008 French Polynesian legislative election
- 2013 French Polynesian legislative election
- 1940 French Polynesian referendum
- French Polynesia men's national junior handball team
- 1958 French Polynesian constitutional referendum
- 2008 French Polynesian presidential election
- February 2009 French Polynesian presidential election

== G ==
- Gaioio
- Gambier (commune)
- Gambier Islands
- Geography of French Polynesia

== H ==
- Haapiti Rahi
- Ha'ava
- Hakahau
- Hakamaii
- Hanakee
- Hana Vave
- Hane, Marquesas Islands
- Hao (French Polynesia)
- Hao Airport
- Haraiki
- Hatutu
- Here Ai'a
- Hereheretue
- Hikueru
- Hikueru Airport
- History of the Marquesas
- Hiti
- Hitiaa O Te Ra
- Hitikau
- Hiva Oa
- Hokatu
- Honotua
- Hotel Bora Bora
- Huahine
- Huahine cuckoo-dove
- Huahine – Fare Airport

== I ==
- Ia Ora 'O Tahiti Nui
- Îles Maria
- Îles Tuamotu-Gambier
- Independent Church of French Polynesia
- Islam in French Polynesia

== K ==
- Kamaka (island)
- Katiu
- Kauehi
- Kaukura
- Kaukura Airport
- Kingdom of Bora Bora
- Kouaku

== L ==
- Leeward Islands (Society Islands)

== M ==
- Mahina, French Polynesia
- Maiao
- Makapu
- Makaroa
- Makatea
- Makemo
- Makemo Airport
- Mangareva
- Mangareva language
- Manihi
- Manihi Airport
- Manuae (Society Islands)
- Manuhangi
- Manui
- Maohi
- Maohi Protestant Church
- Maria Est
- Marokau
- Marotiri
- Marquesan language
- Marquesan Nature Reserves
- Marquesas hotspot
- Marquesas Islands
- Marutea Nord
- Marutea Sud
- Mataiva
- Mataiva Airport
- Matureivavao
- Maupihaa
- Maupiti
- Maupiti (commune)
- Mehetia
- Mekiro
- Missionary Day
- Mohotani
- Mont Oave
- Mont Orohena
- Mo'orea
- Moorea Airport
- Moorea-Maiao
- Morane (French Polynesia)
- Moruroa
- Motane Nature Reserve
- Motu Iti (Marquesas Islands)
- Motu Nao
- Motu-O-Ari
- Motu Oa
- Motu One (Marquesas Islands)
- Motu One Reserve
- Motu One (Society Islands)
- Motu Paahi
- Motu Teiku
- Motutunga
- Mount Duff
- Mount Ronui
- Mount Tohivea
- Mouti
- Musée de Tahiti et des Îles
- Music of French Polynesia
- Music of Tahiti
- Music of the Austral Islands
- Mute Island

== N ==
- Napuka
- Nukutavake
- Napuka Airport
- Nengonengo
- Niau
- Niau Airport
- Nihiru
- No Oe E Te Nunaa
- Notre Dame Cathedral, Papeete
- Notre Dame Cathedral, Taiohae
- Nuku Hiva
- Nukutavake
- Nukutavake Airport
- Nukutepipi

== O ==
- O Porinetia To Tatou Ai'a
- Ome (Bora Bora)
- Order of Tahiti Nui
- Overseas departments and territories of France

== P ==
- Paahi
- Paea
- Palliser Islands
- Pao Pao
- Papara
- Papeari
- Papeete
- Papeete Market
- Papeete Tahiti Temple
- Papenoo River
- Papuri Island
- Paraoa
- Patio (Taha'a)
- Paul Gauguin Cultural Center
- Paul Gauguin Museum (Tahiti)
- Pinaki (French Polynesia)
- Pirae
- Pitiuu Uta
- Point Venus
- Politics of French Polynesia
- Polynesia
- Polynesian languages
- Pōmare Dynasty
- Portland Reef
- Postage stamps and postal history of French Polynesia
- President of French Polynesia
- Puaumu
- Pueu
- Puka-Puka
- Puka-Puka Airport
- Pukarua
- Pukarua Airport
- Puna'auia

== R ==
- Raeffsky Islands
- Raiatea
- Raiatea Airport
- Raivavae
- Raivavae Airport
- Rangiroa
- Rangiroa Airport
- Rangiroa (commune)
- Rapa Iti
- Raraka
- Raroia
- Raroia Airport
- Ravahere
- Reao
- Reao Airport
- Reitoru
- Rekareka
- Rikitea
- Rimatara
- Rimatara Airport
- Roman Catholic Archdiocese of Papeete
- Roman Catholic Diocese of Taiohae
- Rugby union in French Polynesia
- Rumarei
- Rurutu
- Rurutu Airport

== S ==
- St. Michael's Cathedral, Rikitea
- Stade Hamuta
- Stade Pater Te Hono Nui

== T ==
- Ta'a Oa
- Ta'aroa
- Taenga
- Taha'a
- Tahanea
- Taha Uku
- Tahiti
- Tahiti at the 2011 Pacific Games
- Tahiti at the 2015 Pacific Games
- Tahiti at the 2011 World Aquatics Championships
- Tahiti Cup
- Tahiti International
- Tahiti Ligue 2
- Tahiti national basketball team
- Tahiti national beach soccer team
- Tahiti national football team
- Tahiti national rugby sevens team
- Tahiti national rugby union team
- Tahitipresse
- Tahiti Rugby Union
- Tahiti swiftlet
- Tahitian drumming
- Tahitian Football Federation
- Tahitian Handball League
- Tahitian language
- Tahitian pearl
- Tahitian ukulele
- Tahitians
- Tahoera'a Huiraatira
- Tahuata
- Taiarapu-Est
- Taiarapu-Ouest
- Taiaro
- Taiohae
- Tai Pī (province)
- Takapoto
- Takapoto Airport
- Takaroa
- Takaroa Airport
- Takume
- Tane (Bora Bora)
- Tapu (Bora Bora)
- Tapura Amui No Raromatai
- Tapura Amui No Te Faatereraa Manahune – Tuhaa Pae
- Tapura Huiraatira
- Taputapuatea
- Taputapuatea marae
- Tarauru Roa
- Taravai
- Tatakoto
- Tatakoto Airport
- Tauere
- Taufarii
- Tauna
- Tautira
- Tautira Bay
- Tavini Huiraatira
- Teahitia
- Teahupo'o
- Teauaone
- Teauotu
- Tekava
- Tekokota
- Telecommunications in French Polynesia
- Telephone numbers in French Polynesia
- Tematagi
- Temetiu
- Temoe
- Tenararo
- Tenarunga
- Tenoko
- Tepapuri
- Tepoto (South)
- Te Tiarama
- Teohootepohatu
- Tepoto (North)
- Tepu Nui
- Terihi
- Tetiaroa
- Teva I Uta
- Tevairoa
- Tiarama Adventist College
- Tikei
- Tikehau
- Tikehau Airport
- Tiputa Pass
- Tiripone Mama Taira Putairi
- Toau
- Tokorua
- Toopua
- To'ovi'i
- Totegegie Airport
- Transport in French Polynesia
- Tuaeu
- Tuamotuan language
- Tuanake
- Tubuai
- Tubuai – Mataura Airport
- Tumaraa
- Tūpai
- Tupe (Bora Bora)
- Tureia
- Tureia Airport
- Two Groups Islands

== U ==
- Ua Huka
- Ua Pou
- University of French Polynesia
- Uturoa

== V ==
- Vahanga
- Vahitahi
- Vahitahi Airport
- Vaiatekeue
- Vaipae'e
- Vaipō Waterfall
- Vairaatea
- Vairao
- Vaitahu
- Vaitape
- Vaitepiha River
- Vaituha
- Vananui
- Vanavana
- Vanilla production in French Polynesia

== W ==
- Wan Air
- Windward Islands (Society Islands)

== Lists related to French Polynesia ==
- List of airlines of French Polynesia
- List of football clubs in French Polynesia
- List of mammals of French Polynesia
- List of monarchs of Bora Bora
- List of monarchs of Huahine
- List of monarchs of Mangareva
- List of monarchs of Raiatea
- List of monarchs of Tahiti
- List of volcanoes in French Polynesia

== See also ==
- List of cities in French Polynesia
- Lists of country-related topics
- List of international rankings
- Outline of French Polynesia
- Topic outline of geography
