= St. Michael's Cathedral, Rikitea =

St. Michael's Cathedral, Rikitea Cathédrale Saint-Michel, Rikitea (in French)
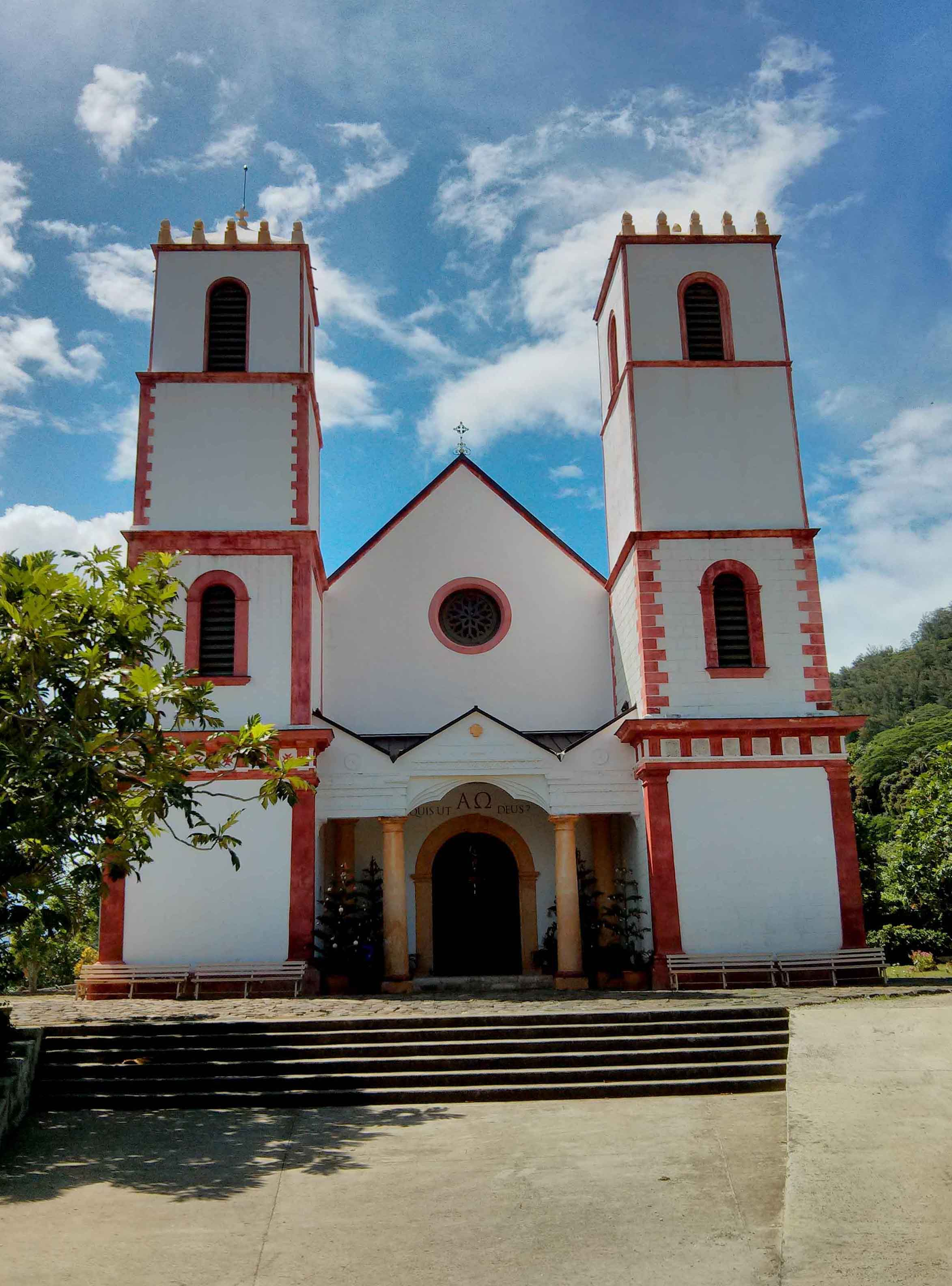
- A white washed St. Michael's Cathedral on Mangareva island
- St. Michael's Cathedral, Rikitea; Cathédrale Saint-Michel, Rikitea (in French)
- 23°7′13″S 134°58′9″W
- Country: French Polynesia
- Denomination: Roman Catholic

History
- Status: Former cathedral
- Consecrated

Architecture
- Functional status: Active
- Style: Neo Gothic
- Groundbreaking: 17 January 1839
- Completed: 1848

Administration
- Archdiocese: Roman Catholic Archdiocese of Papeete

St. Michael's Cathedral (French: Cathédrale Saint-Michel, Rikitea), also known as the Rikitea Cathedral, is a parish of the Catholic Church located on Mangareva Island in the Gambier Islands of French Polynesia.

Its historic neo-Gothic church was built on the eastern side of Rikitea between 1839 and 1848 by missionaries of the Congregation of the Sacred Hearts of Jesus and Mary. It formerly served as cathedral for what is now the Archdiocese of Papeete, and was extensively renovated in 2011. The parish community remains very active, within the limitations of the small population of the island.

== History ==
The cathedral was built under the auspices of the Picpus Fathers by Father Cyprien Liausu, Superior of the Mission of Our Lady of Peace in the Gambiers, after he arrived in Rikitea in 1835.

The cornerstone for the cathedral was laid on 17 January 1839, and Bishop Étienne Jérôme Rouchouze blessed the site on 4 April 1839. Lay brothers Gilbert Soulié and Fabien Costes were responsible for the masonry work, assisted by fifteen native workers. Bishop Florentin-Étienne Jaussen visited in February 1849 and was sufficiently impressed that in April 1856 Soulié and sixty Mangareva workers travelled to Tahiti to work on Notre Dame Cathedral in Papeete. Ten years later, these same skilled workers constructed the beacon at Point Venus in Tahiti.

== Architecture ==
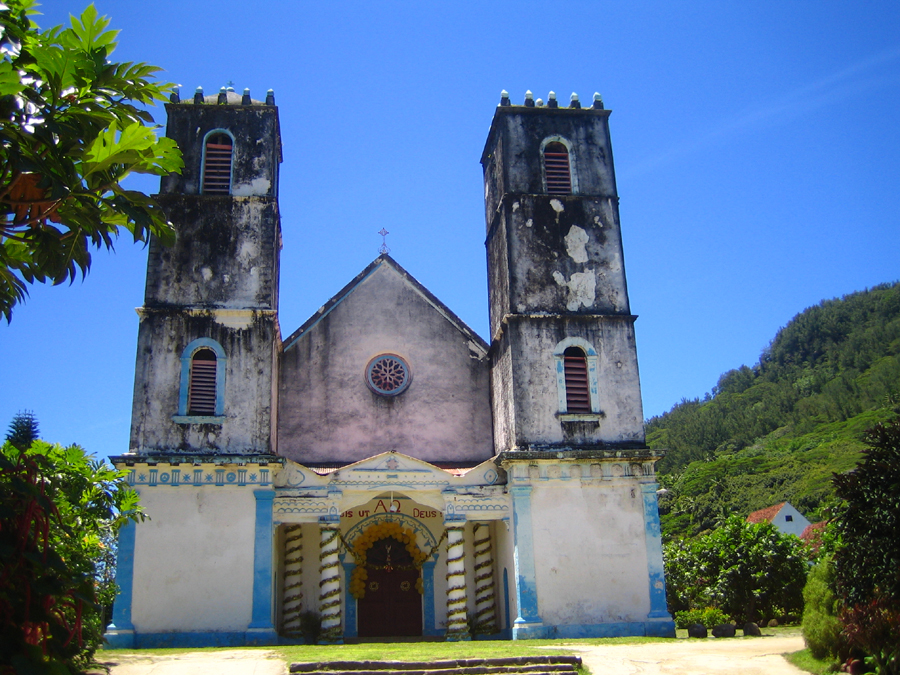
St. Michael's Cathedral before renovation in 2006

The building measures 48 metres (157 ft) in length, is 18 metres (59 ft) wide, and rises to a height of 21 metres (69 ft). It can seat 1200 people, and is thrice the size of the current cathedral, Notre Dame Cathedral in Papeete. Indeed, it remains the largest church in the South Pacific.

The structure is constructed of coral limestone and coral lime plaster, painstakingly imported by raft from quarries at Tauna, Tekava, and Kouaku. The two towers were built in 1847–48.

The interior is richly decorated with mother of pearl. The altar has ornamentation of fine pearl oyster engravings of Mother-of-pearls, encased with black pearls.

François Caret, a colleague of Laval, was buried in a crypt before the altar. The tomb of Maputeoa (died 1857), who was the king of Mangareva, is situated in a separate chapel, the Chapel of St. Pierre, Atititoa. Many other early Catholic missionaries are also buried here.

The cathedral was extensively refurbished starting in 2009, at a controversial cost of 4.5 million euros, and re-opened to worship on December 3, 2011.

Above the entrance is the inscription ‘Quis ut Deus’ the meaning of ‘Who is like God’ and the literal meaning of the Hebrew ‘Michael’.

== Bibliography ==
- Brash, Celeste; Carillet, Jean-Bernard (2009). Tahiti and French Polynesia. Lonely Planet. ISBN 978-1-74104-316-7.
- Laval, Honoré; Newbury, C. W.; O'Reilly, Patrick (1968). Mémoires pour servir à l'histoire de Mangareva: ère chrétienne, 1834-1871. Paris: Musée de l'Homme.
- Kelly, Alexis C. (21 October 2008). Fodor's Tahiti & French Polynesia. Fodor's Travel Publications. ISBN 978-1-4000-0683-0.
- Kirk, Robert W. (24 October 2012). Paradise Past: The Transformation of the South Pacific, 1520-1920. McFarland. ISBN 978-0-7864-6978-9.
- Stanley, David (1999). South Pacific Handbook. David Stanley. p. 266. ISBN 978-1-56691-172-6.
