= Taravai =

Island in French Polynesia

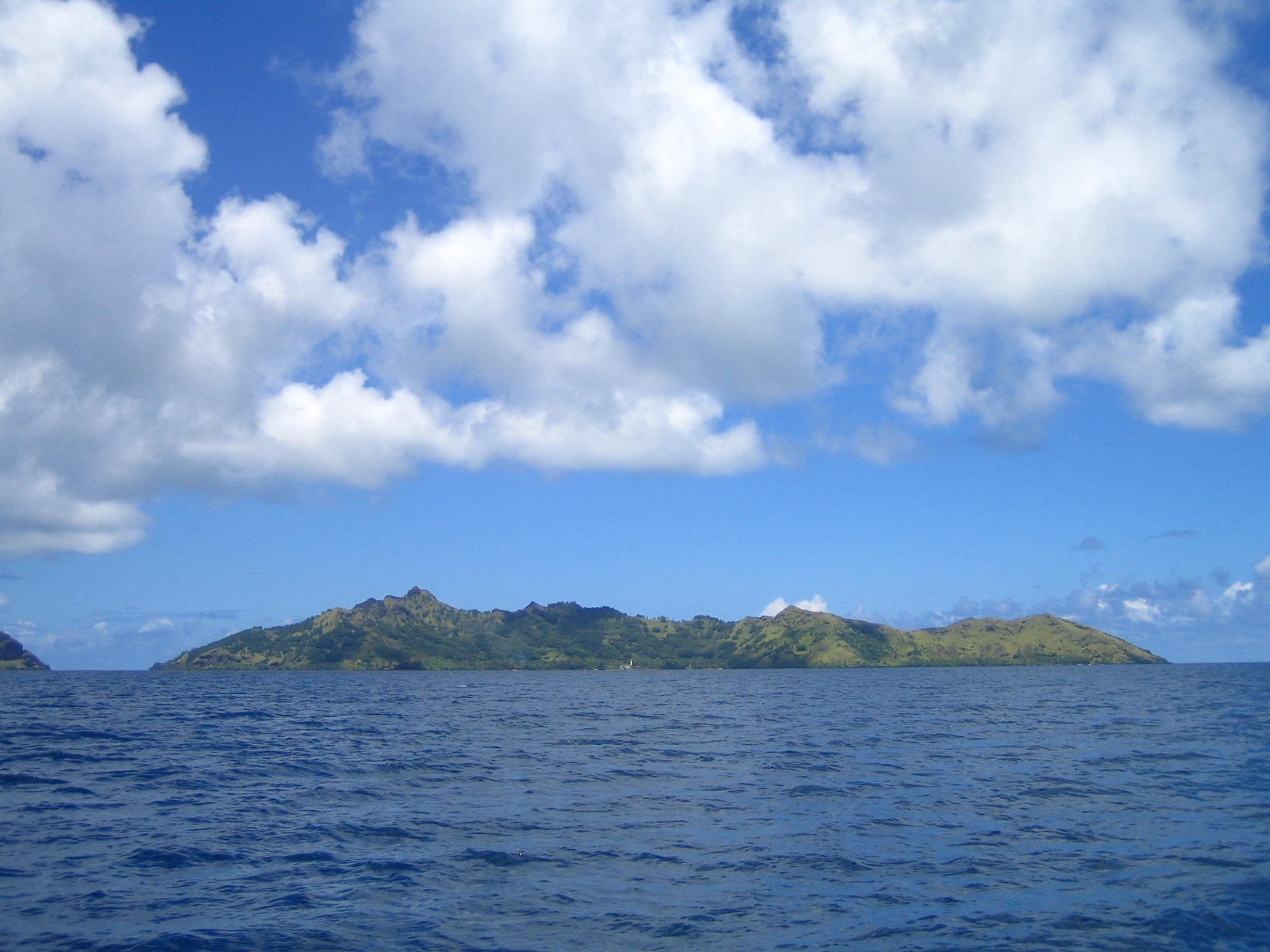
- View of Taravai

- Location within French Polynesia

Geography
- Location: Pacific Ocean
- Coordinates: 23°08′12″S 135°01′33″W
- Archipelago: Tuamotus
- Area: 5.7 km^{2} (2.2 sq mi)
- Highest elevation: 256 m (840 ft)
- Highest point: (unnamed)

Administration
- France
- Overseas collectivity: French Polynesia
- Administrative subdivision: Îles Tuamotu-Gambier
- Commune: Gambier
- Largest settlement: Agonoko

Demographics
- Population: 9 (2012)

Taravai is the second largest island in the Gambier Islands archipelago of French Polynesia, at 5.7 km^{2}. Taravai is about 1.5 km southwest of Mangareva, the largest island of the whole Gambier group, and about 300 m north of the island of Angakauitai. Off its eastern shore lies the tiny rock Îlot Motu-o-ari.

The village named Agonoko is located near the main bay on the island's eastern shore. It has a population of 9 (as of 2012). Former villages were Aga-nui (northwest) and Agakau-i-uta (southeast).

The Onemea archaeological site suggests sporadic occupation of the island around AD 950 with a possible continuous settlement since the 13th century.

Before the conversion to Christianity, the king of Taravai was a vassal to the king of Rikitea in Mangareva.

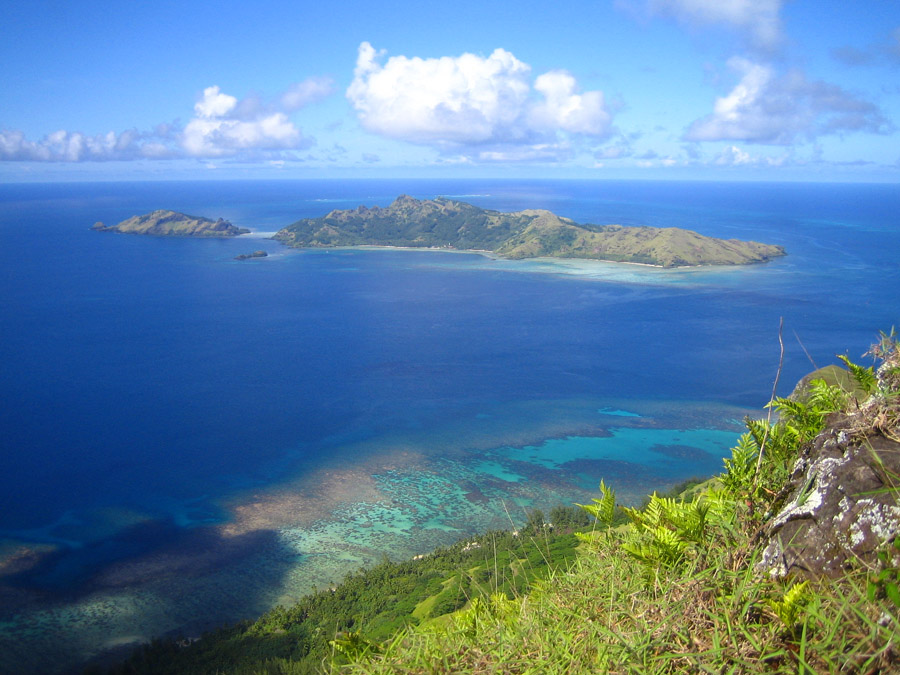
View of Taravai and Angakauitai from Mont Mokoto

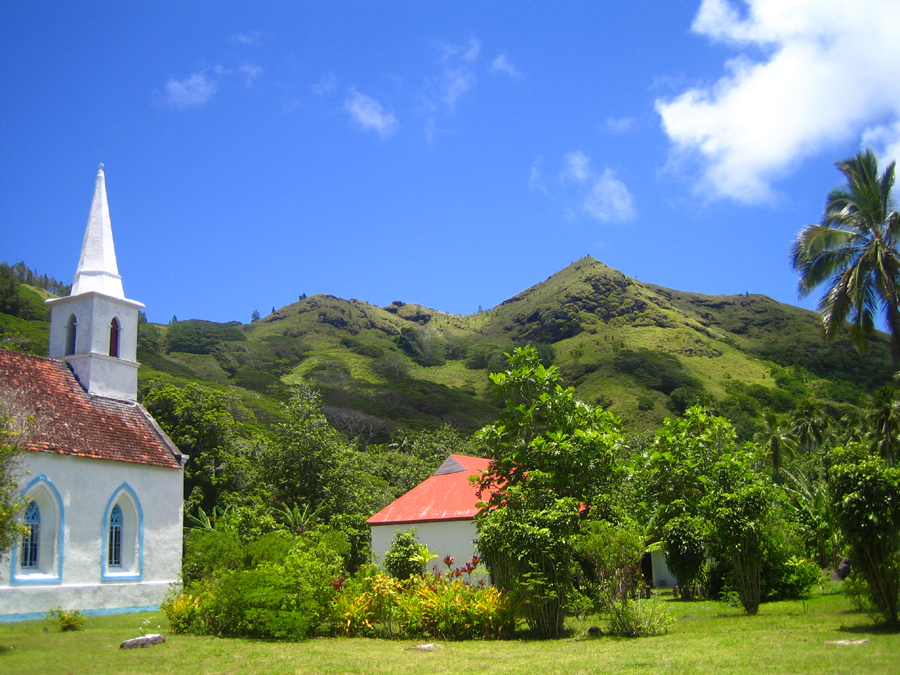
Church of Saint-Gabriel

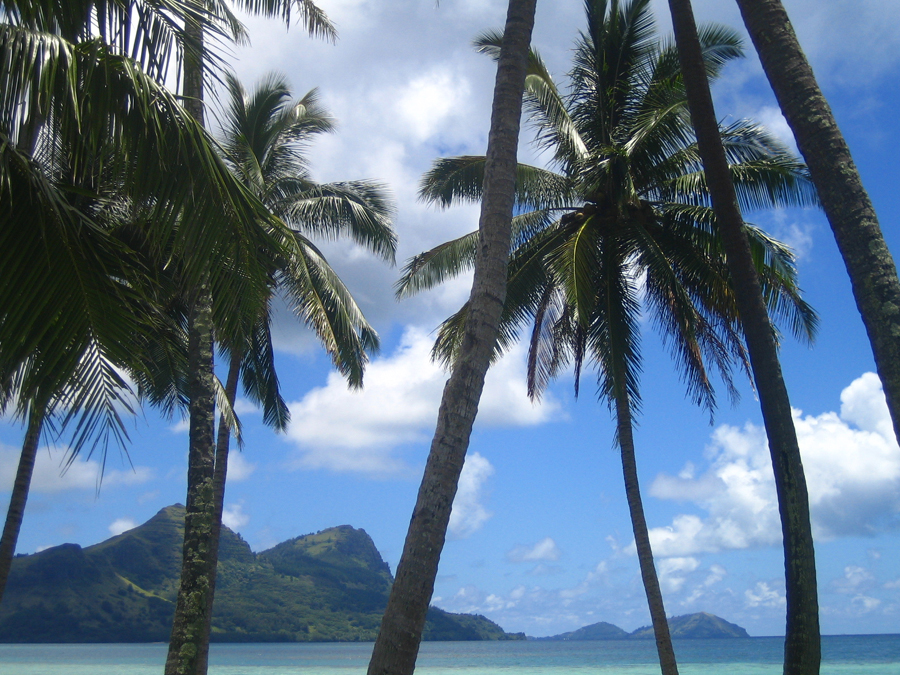
View of Mangareva and Aukena from Taravai

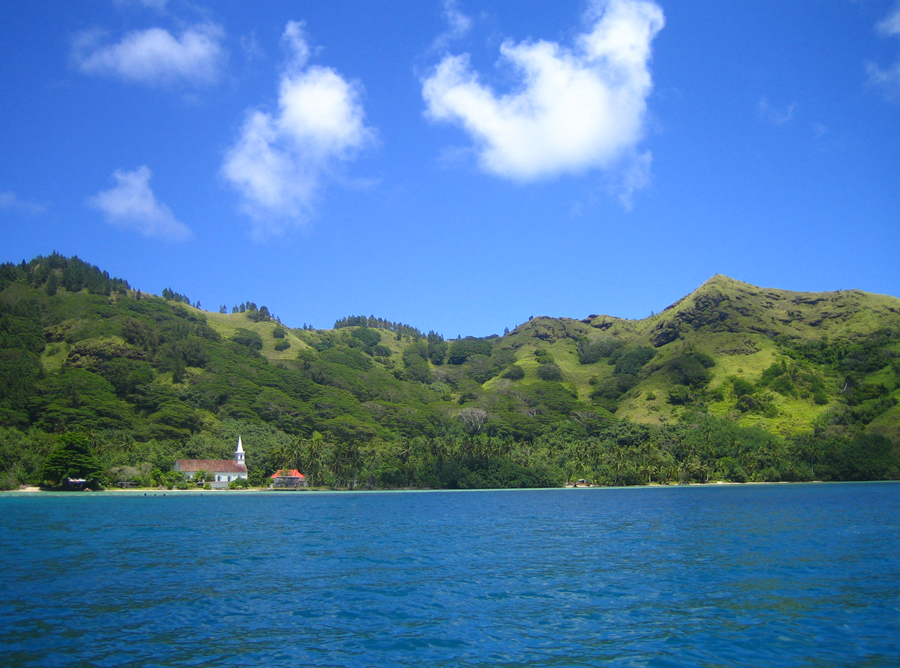
Taravai
