= Akamaru =

Akamaru may refer to:

- Akamaru (Naruto), Kiba Inuzuka's dog in the Naruto series
- Akamaru Island, an island in the Gambier Islands
- Akamaru Jump, a special edition of Shōnen Jump published thrice a year
