= Papuri =

Papuri may refer to:

- Papuri Island, an island of the Gambier Islands of French Polynesia
- Papurí River in South America
