= Gambier (commune) =

Commune in French Polynesia, France

- Commune
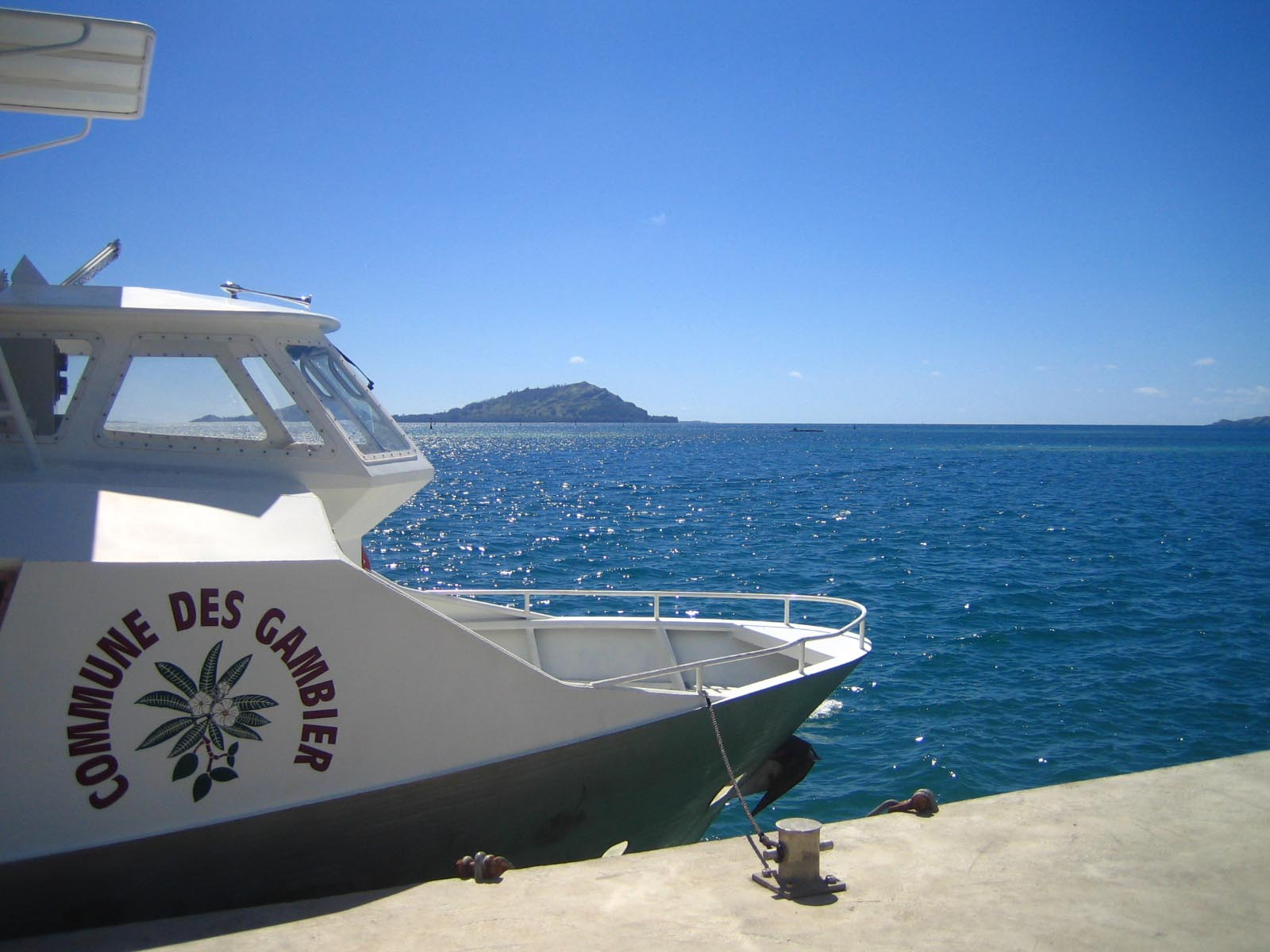
- A ship from Gambier

- Flag

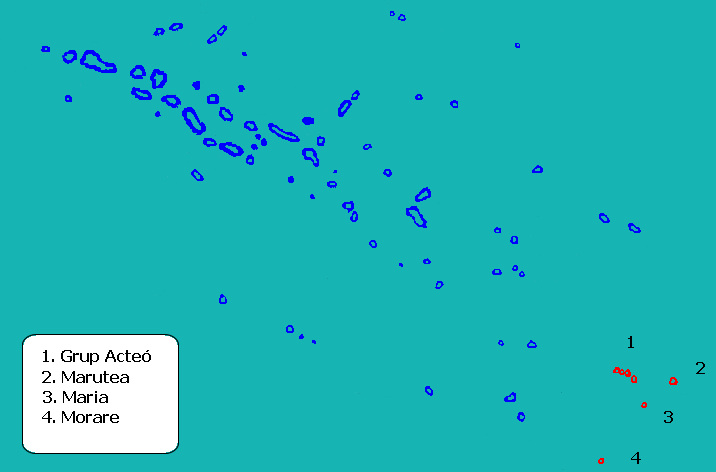
- Location (in red) within the Tuamotu Archipelago
- Location of Gambier
- Coordinates: 23°08′S 134°56′W
- Country: France
- Overseas collectivity: French Polynesia
- Subdivision: Îles Tuamotu-Gambier

Government
  - Mayor (2020–2026): Vai Vianello Gooding
- Area^{1}: 45.97 km^{2} (17.75 sq mi)
- Highest elevation: 441 m (1,447 ft)
- Lowest elevation: 0 m (0 ft)
- Population (2022): 1,570
  - Density: 34.2/km^{2} (88.5/sq mi)
- Time zone: UTC−09:00
- INSEE/Postal code: 98719 /98755
- ^{1} French Land Register data, which excludes lakes, ponds, glaciers > 1 km^{2} (0.386 sq mi or 247 acres) and river estuaries.

Gambier (French pronunciation: [ɡɑ̃bje]) is a commune of French Polynesia in the administrative subdivision of the Tuamotu-Gambier Islands. The commune includes the Gambier Islands as well as several atolls in the Tuamotu Archipelago (the Acteon Group and the isolated atolls of Maria Est, Morane, and Marutea Sud). All the Tuamotu atolls belonging to the commune are uninhabited except for Marutea Sud, and are sometimes mistakenly included among the Gambier Islands themselves. The commune population was 1,570 at the 2022 census. Its total land area is 45.97 km^{2}.

== Administration ==
The commune of Gambier is made up of the following islands:

- Akamaru
- Angakauitai
- Aukena
- Kamaka
- Makaroa
- Mangareva
- Manui
- Maria
- Marutea Sud
- Matureivavao
- Morane
- Taravai
- Temoe
- Tenararo
- Tenarunga
- Vahanga

The chef-lieu of the commune is the village Rikitea on the island of Mangareva.

Together with the Tuamotus, the Gambier Islands form the administrative subdivision Îles Tuamotu-Gambier (French officially: la subdivision administrative des îles Tuamotu-Gambier), one of the five primary administrative divisions of French Polynesia.

The commune Gambier, together with the communes in the eastern part of the Tuamotus (Anaa, Fangatau, Hao, Hikueru, Makemo, Napuka, Nukutavake, Puka-Puka, Reao, Tatakoto and Tureia), forms Îles Gambier et Tuamotu de l'Est, one of the 8 electoral sections for the Assembly of French Polynesia (Assemblée de la Polynésie française).

== History ==
see Gambier Islands

== See also ==
- Communes of French Polynesia
