= Atumata =

Island in French Polynesia

Coordinates: 23.1993°S 134.9063°W

Atumata is an island of the Gambier Islands of French Polynesia located to the northeast of the Akamaru island.

== See also ==
- Desert island
- List of islands
