= Kamaka (island) =

Island in French Polynesia

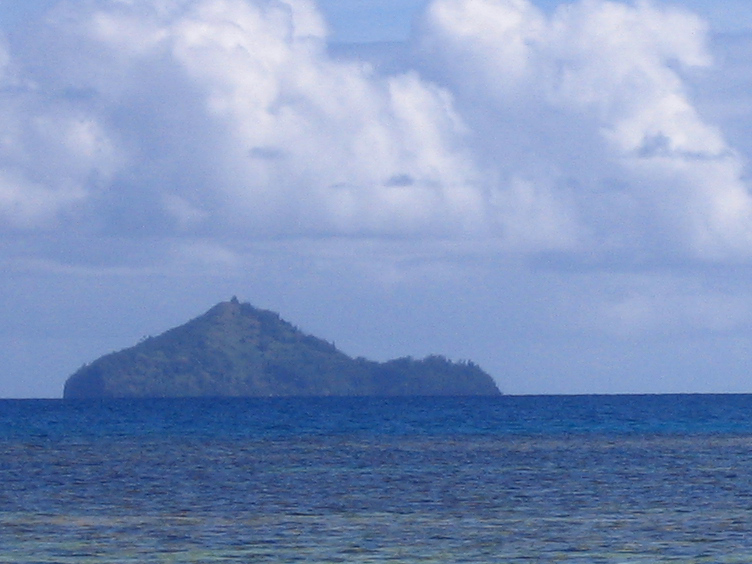
- View of Kamaka Island

- Location within French Polynesia

Geography
- Location: Pacific Ocean
- Coordinates: 23°14′39″S 134°37′30″W
- Archipelago: Tuamotus
- Area: 0.5 km^{2} (0.19 sq mi)
- Length: 1 km (0.6 mi)
- Width: 0.7 km (0.43 mi)
- Highest elevation: 166 m (545 ft)
- Highest point: (unnamed)

Administration
- France
- Overseas collectivity: French Polynesia
- Administrative subdivision: Îles Tuamotu-Gambier
- Commune: Gambier

Demographics
- Population: Uninhabited (2012)

Kamaka (previously known as Mito) is an island in the Gambier Islands of French Polynesia, 11.7 km south of Mangareva within the same lagoon. Kamaka is about one kilometre (0.6 miles) in length, 700 metres (2,300 feet) wide, and has an area of 0.5 square kilometres (0.2 square miles). The highest point is 166 metres (545 feet) above sea level. There are no permanent springs on the island.

1.8 kilometres (1.1 miles) to the NNW rises barren and rugged Makaroa island and off Kamaka's northeastern shore lies the small Manui islet.

The island was not permanently inhabited before European contact, with occupation being short-term and focused on fishing. It is now uninhabited.

In 2015 a conservation campaign was successful in eradicating rats from the island.
