= Pitiuu Uta =

Island in the Society Islands, French Polynesia

Coordinates: 16.540°S 151.727°W

Pitiuu Uta Island
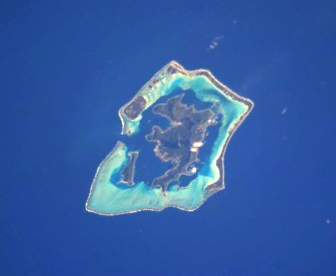
- The Bora Bora Group.
- Interactive map of Pitiuu Uta Island

Geography
- Location: Pacific Ocean
- Archipelago: Society Islands
- Area: 0.034 km^{2} (0.013 sq mi)
- Highest elevation: 0 m (0 ft)

Administration
- France
- Commune: Bora Bora Commune
- Island Group: Bora Bora
- Largest settlement: Sofitel Bora Bora Private Island (pop. 2 inhabitants)

Demographics
- Population: 2 (2016)
- Pop. density: 59/km^{2} (153/sq mi)

Motu Pitiuu Uta, also known as Sofitel Motu, is a 0.034 km^{2} (0.0 sq mi) island in the Bora Bora Islands Group, within the Society Islands of French Polynesia. It is the located between Pitiuu Tai, and Matira Beach on the main island.

The island is the site of the Sofitel Bora Bora Private Island.

The nearest airport is Bora Bora Airport.

== Administration ==
The island is part of Bora Bora Commune.
