= Independent Church of French Polynesia =

Church in French Polynesia, Oceania

The Independent Church of French Polynesia was founded in the 1940s when a single parish of Afahaati refused to move its pastor to another congregation. It is pastored now by Rev. Jean-Pierre Aumeran. The single church has about 100 members. It is a Reformed church.
