= Aukena =

Island in French Polynesia

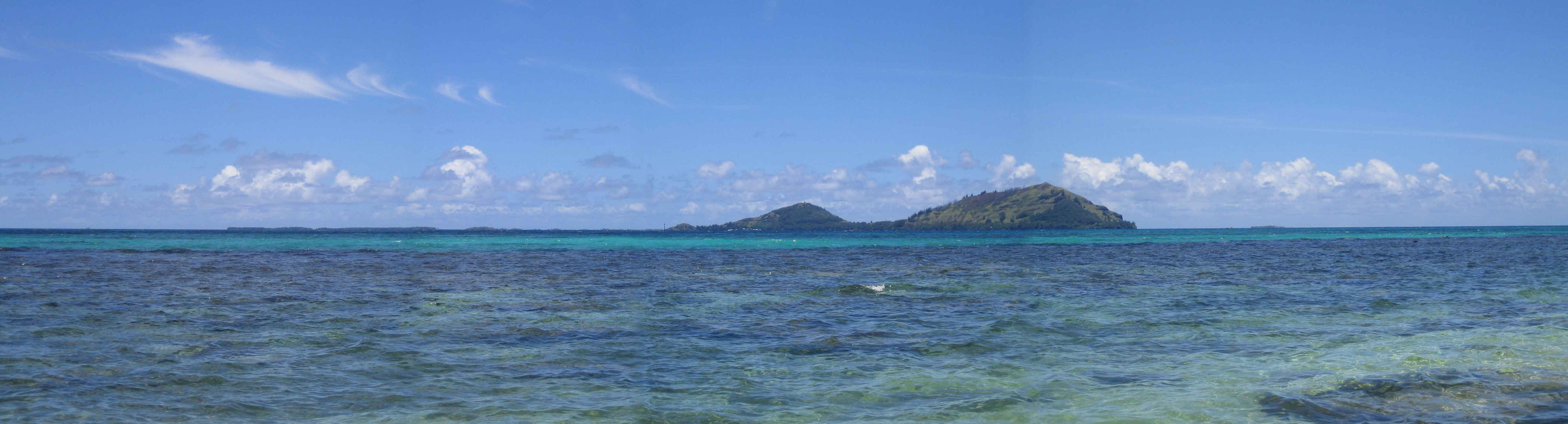
- View of Aukena from Mangareva

- Location within French Polynesia

Geography
- Location: Pacific Ocean
- Coordinates: 23°06′42″S 134°54′01″W
- Archipelago: Tuamotus
- Area: 1.35 km^{2} (0.52 sq mi)
- Length: 2.5 km (1.55 mi)
- Width: 0.5 km (0.31 mi)
- Highest elevation: 198 m (650 ft)
- Highest point: (unnamed)

Administration
- France
- Overseas collectivity: French Polynesia
- Administrative subdivision: Îles Tuamotu-Gambier
- Commune: Gambier

Demographics
- Population: 40 (2012)
- Pop. density: 30/km^{2} (80/sq mi)

Aukena is the 5th largest of the Gambier Islands in French Polynesia. Aukena is located about halfway between Mangareva and Akamaru, or about 5 km southeast of Mangareva, which is the largest island of the whole Gambier Islands archipelago. Aukena is approximately 2.5 km long and about 0.5 km wide, with a total area of 1.35 km^{2}.

Mangarevan oral tradition first mentions the island in the fourteenth century, and archaeological excavations show that it has been inhabited since then.

== Gallery ==
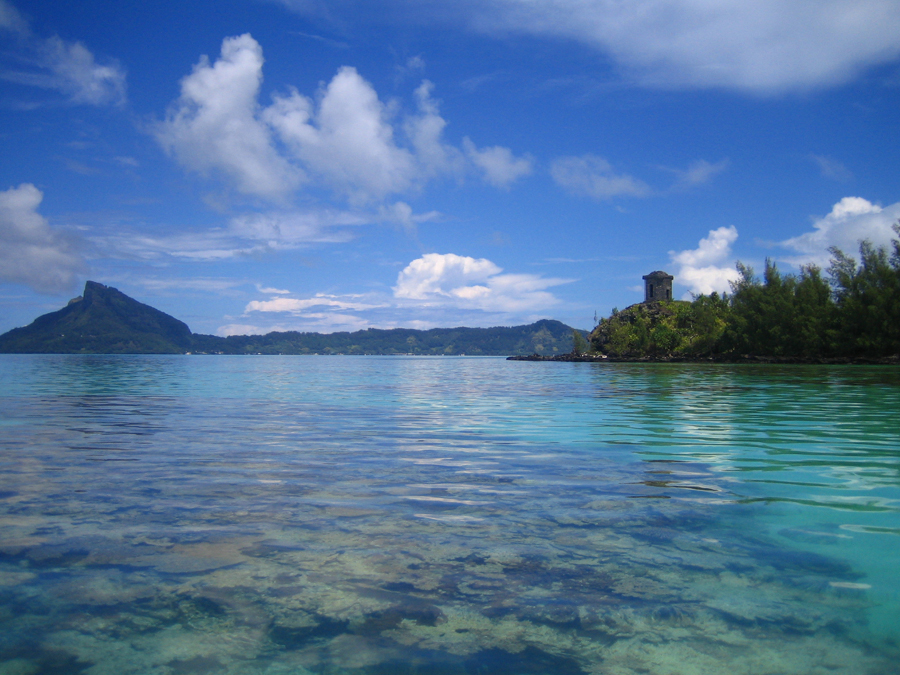
Watchtower. Background: Mangareva Island

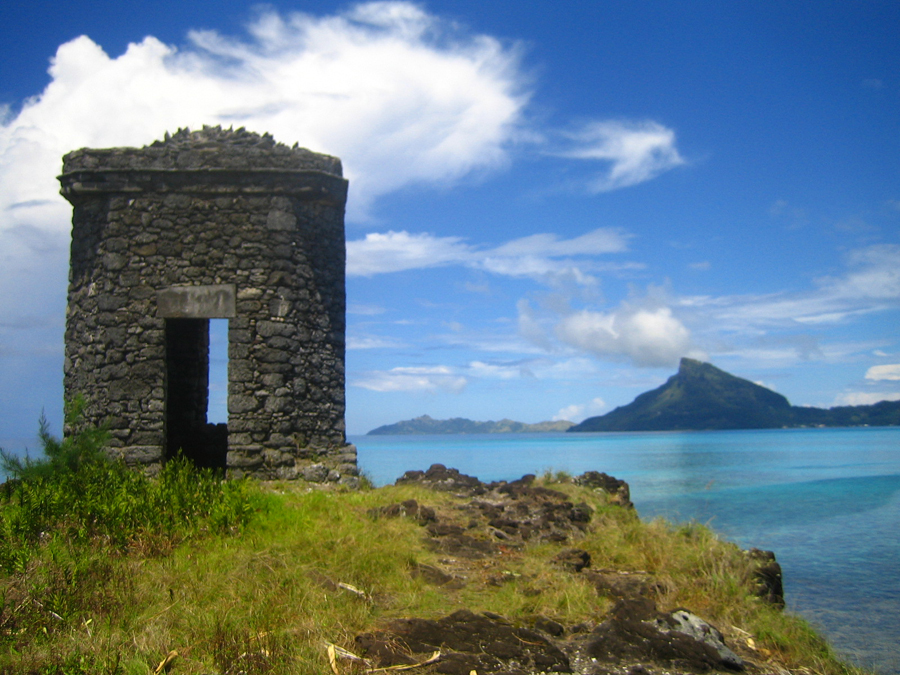
Watchtower. Background: Mt. Duff

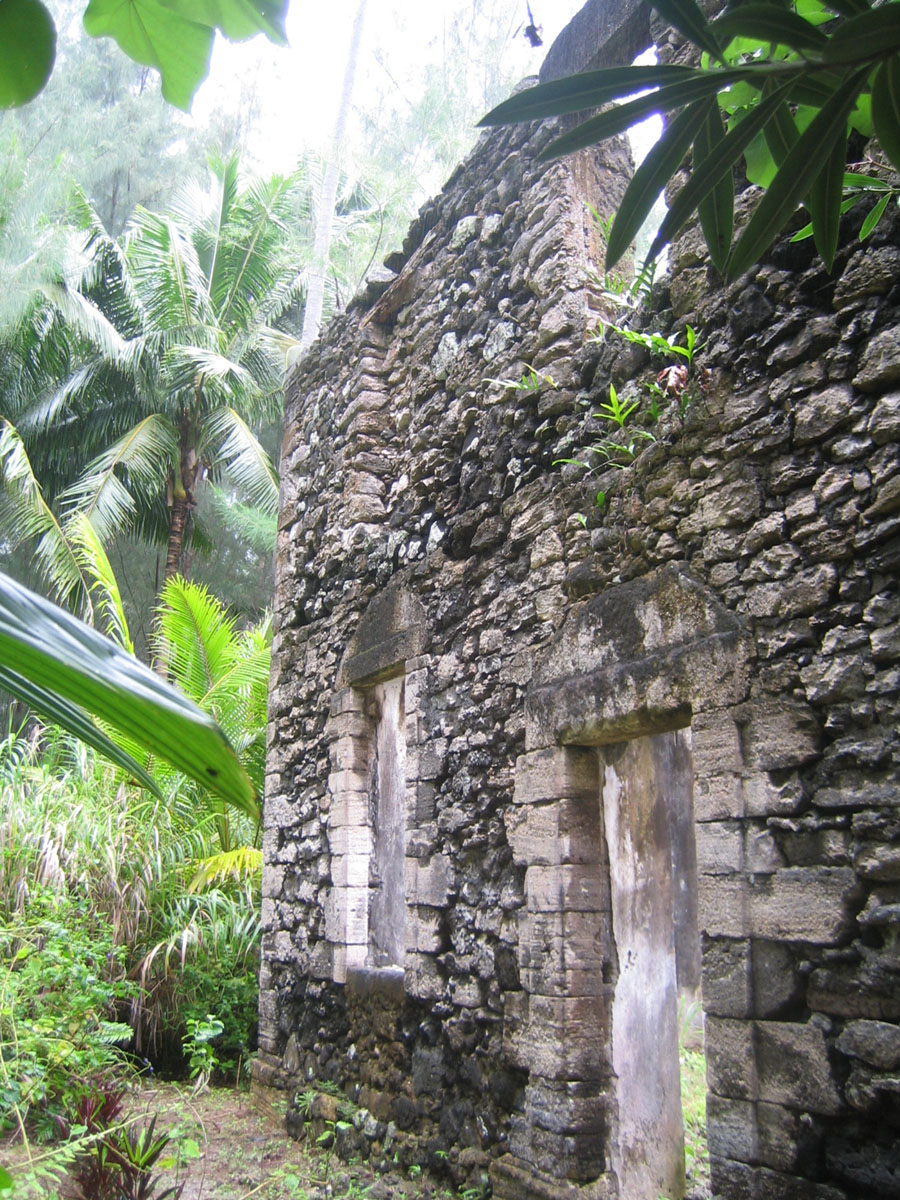
Ruins of Re'e Seminary College, the first college of French Polynesia

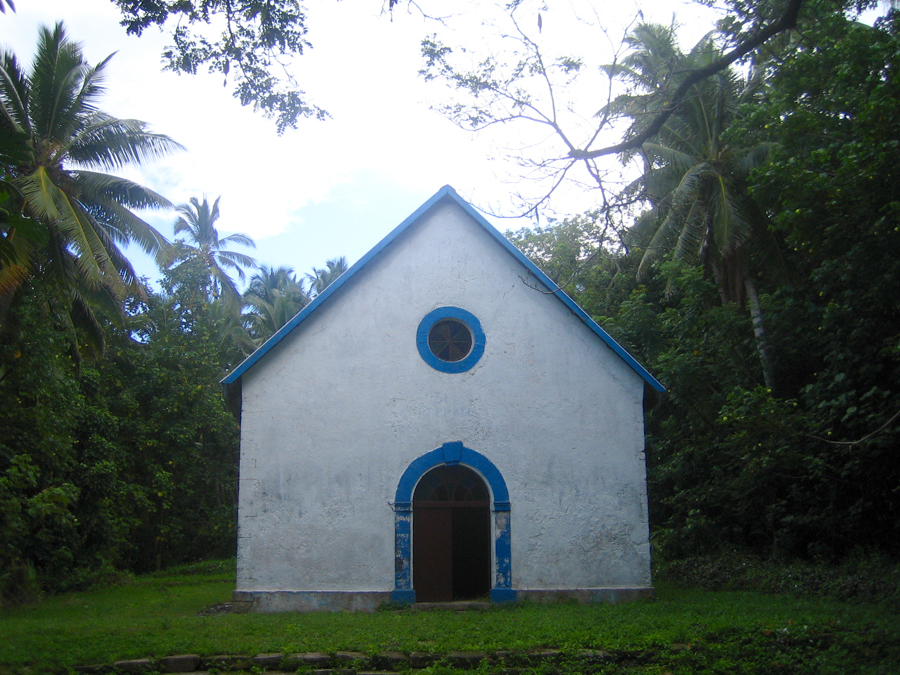
Church of St. Raphael

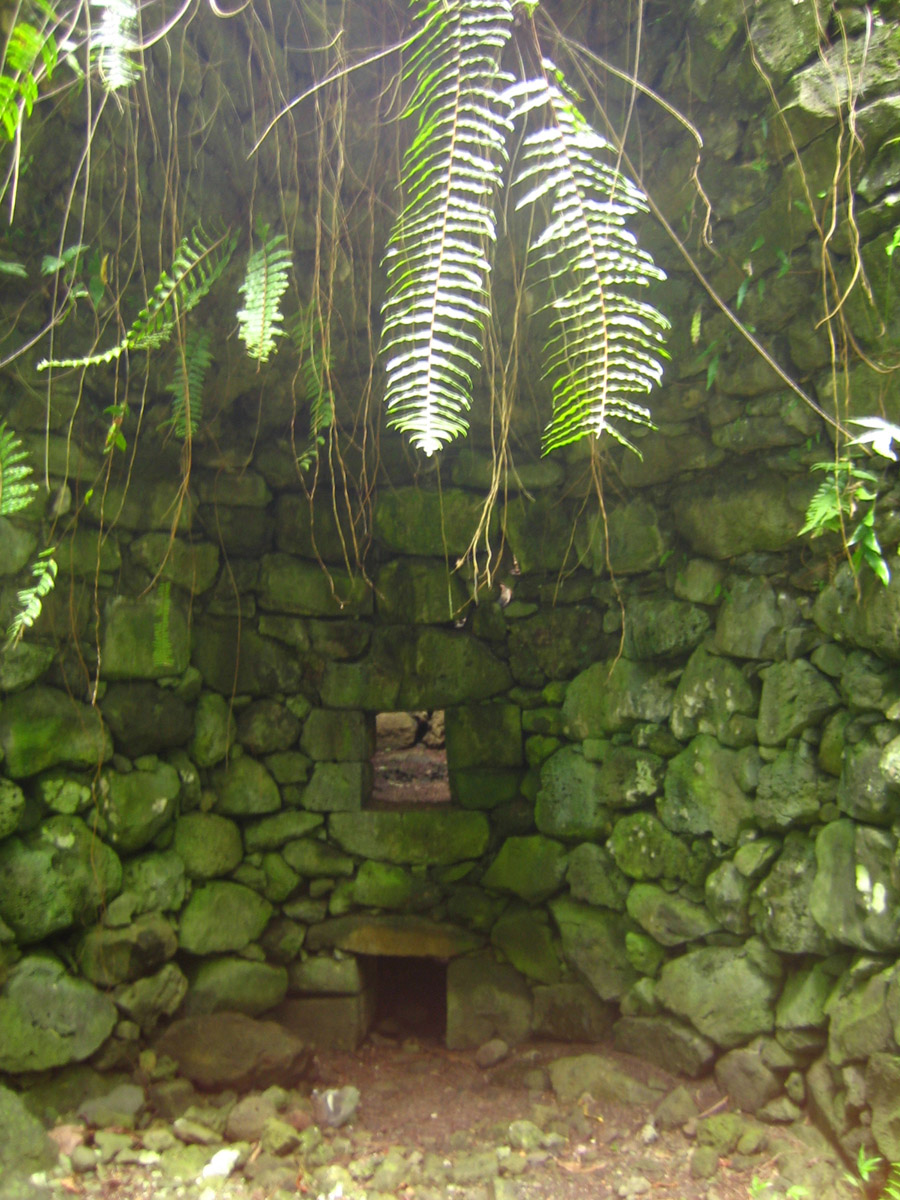
Oven for coral lime. Missionaries used it to build various churches in the Gambier Islands.

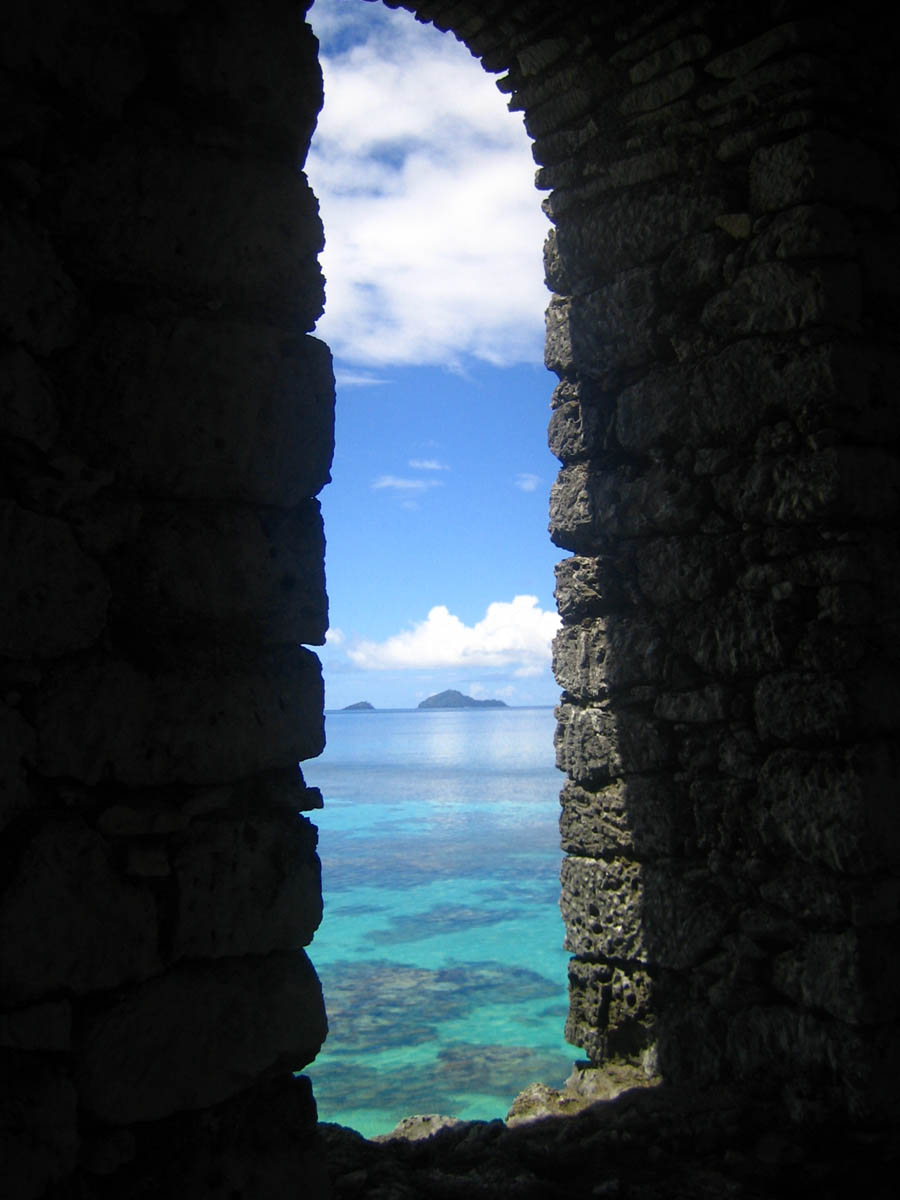
View from the watchtower. View is of Manui and Kamaka
