= Tepu Nui =

Island in French Polynesia

Coordinates: 23°10′S 135°03′W

Tepu Nui is an island of the Gambier Islands of French Polynesia.

== See also ==
- Desert island
- List of islands
