= Makapu =

Island in French Polynesia

Coordinates: 23.19°S 134.92°W

Makapu is an island of the Gambier Islands of French Polynesia.

== See also ==
- Desert island
- List of islands
