= Tarauru Roa =

Island in French Polynesia

Coordinates: 23.109°S 134.856°W

Tarauru Roa as seen from the water

Tarauru Roa is an island of the Gambier Islands of French Polynesia.

== See also ==
- Desert island
- List of islands
