= Rumarei =

Island of French Polynesia

Coordinates: 23°07′S 134°59′W

Rumarei is an island of the Gambier Islands of French Polynesia.. Rumarei is a small, uninhabited coral islet (0.007 km²) in the Gambier Islands archipelago of French Polynesia, part of the broader Tuamotu-Gambier administrative subdivision in the South Pacific Ocean.

== See also ==
- Desert island
- List of islands
