= Puaumu =

Island in French Polynesia

Coordinates: 23.017°S 134.918°W

Puaumu is an island of the Gambier Islands of French Polynesia.

== See also ==
- Desert island
- List of islands
