= Vaiatekeue =

Island in French Polynesia

Coordinates: 23°3′31″S 134°54′24″W

Vaiatekeue is an island of the Gambier Islands of French Polynesia.

== See also ==
- Desert island
- List of islands
