= Tenoko =

Island in French Polynesia

Coordinates: 23.0747°S 135.0122°W

Tenoko is an island of the Gambier Islands of French Polynesia.

== See also ==
- Desert island
- List of islands
