= Christian Church in French Polynesia =

The Christian Church in French Polynesia was formed in 1958 when a single parish left the Maói Protestant Church. It was motivated by a political issue, this church supported the independence from France, while the Maói Protestant Church was against it. There are no theological differences between these churches. In 2004 there were 8 congregations and 1,000 members.
