= Gaioio =

Island of the Gambier Islands

Coordinates: 23°07′S 134°50′W

Gaioio is an island of the Gambier Islands of French Polynesia.

== See also ==
- Desert island
- List of islands
