= Avatika =

Atoll in French Polynesia

- Location within French Polynesia

Geography
- Location: South Pacific Ocean
- Coordinates: 14°56′S 147°51′W
- Length: 1 km (0.6 mi)
- Width: 500 m (1600 ft)

Administration
- French Polynesia

Demographics
- Population: 0

Avatika is an uninhabited island near Avatoru in the Tuamotus Islands in French Polynesia (Oceania). The neighbouring islands are Motu Mahuta and Motu Teavahia and together they form part of the Rangiroa atoll.

== See also ==
- Desert island
- List of islands
