= Motu Teiku =

Pacific island of French Polynesia

Coordinates: 23.2113°S 134.9755°W

Motu Teiku is an island of the Gambier Islands of French Polynesia.

== See also ==
- Desert island
- List of islands
