= Apou =

Island in French Polynesia

Coordinates: 23°04′S 134°54′W

Apou is an island of the Gambier Islands of French Polynesia.

== See also ==
- Desert island
- List of islands
