= Teauaone =

Island in French Polynesia

Coordinates: 23.0044°S 134.9551°W

Teauaone is an island of the Gambier Islands of French Polynesia.

== See also ==
- Desert island
- List of islands
