= Tepapuri =

Island in French Polynesia

Coordinates: 23.0066°S 134.9455°W

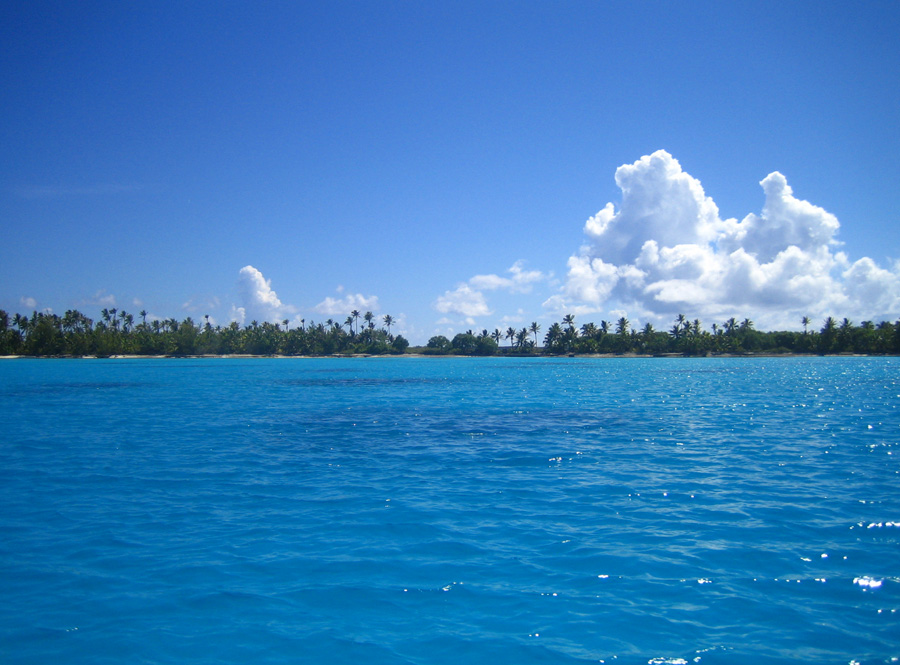
View of Tepapuri Island

Tepapuri is an island of the Gambier Islands of French Polynesia.

== See also ==
- Desert island
- List of islands
