= Teohootepohatu =

Island in French Polynesia

Coordinates: 23.1777°S 134.8903°W

Teohootepohatu is an island of the Gambier Islands of French Polynesia.

== See also ==
- Desert island
- List of islands
