= Makaroa =

Island in French Polynesia

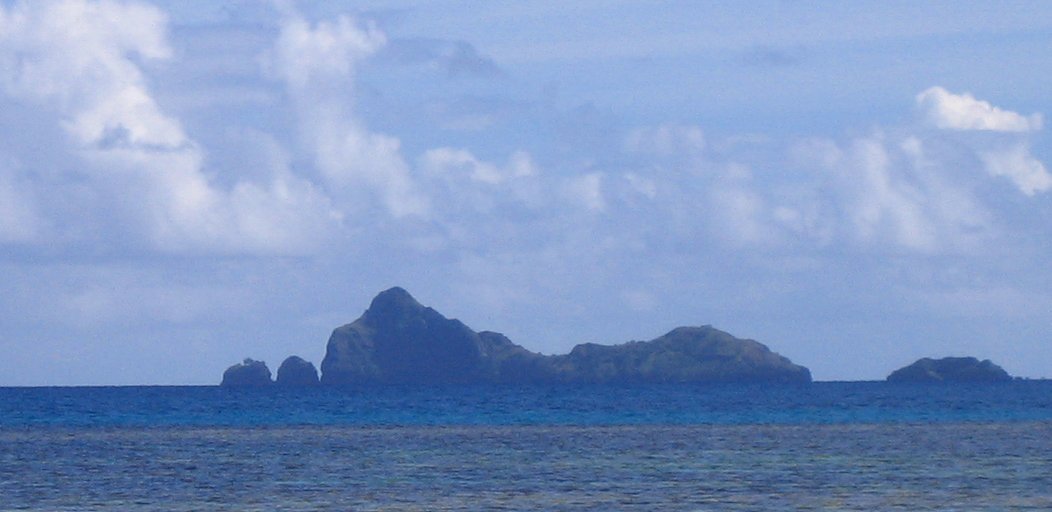
- View of Makaroa Island

- Location within French Polynesia

Geography
- Location: Pacific Ocean
- Coordinates: 23°13′08″S 134°58′16″W
- Archipelago: Tuamotus
- Area: 0.2 km^{2} (0.077 sq mi)
- Length: 1.3 km (0.81 mi)
- Highest elevation: 138 m (453 ft)
- Highest point: (unnamed)

Administration
- France
- Overseas collectivity: French Polynesia
- Administrative subdivision: Îles Tuamotu-Gambier
- Commune: Gambier

Demographics
- Population: Uninhabited (2012)

Makaroa is an island in the Gambier Islands of French Polynesia, 8.5 km south of Mangareva within the same lagoon. Makaroa is about 1.3 km (1 mi) in length and has a small rocky islet off its NW point.

Makaroa is uninhabited. It is a jagged and barren island with a maximum height of 138 m. 1.8 km (1 mi) to the SSE lies Kamaka Island.

In 2015 a conservation campaign resulted in the eradication of rats from the island.
