= Motu-O-Ari =

Island in French Polynesia

Coordinates: 23.1510°S 135.0217°W

Motu-O-Ari is an island of the Gambier Islands of French Polynesia.

== See also ==
- Desert island
- List of islands
