= Papuri Island =

Island in French Polynesia

Coordinates: 23°0′24.43″S 134°57′49.75″W

Papuri is an island of the Gambier Islands of French Polynesia.

== See also ==
- Desert island
- List of islands
