= Kouaku =

Island in French Polynesia

Coordinates: 23.2092°S 134.8589°W

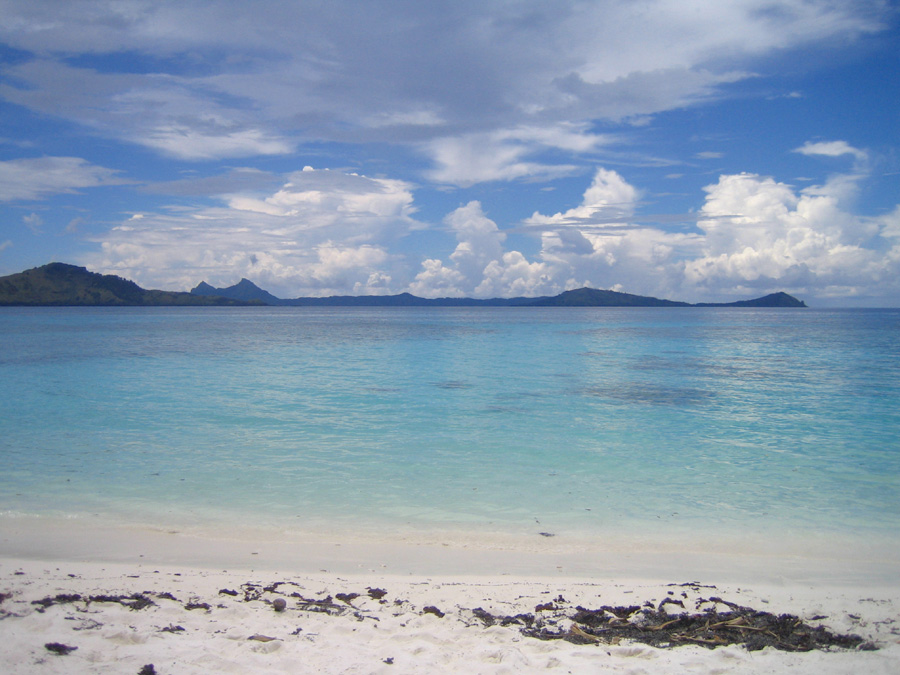
View from Kouaku Island across the lagoon to the Gambier Islands Akamaru, Mangareva and Aukena

Kouaku is an island of the Gambier Islands of French Polynesia.

== See also ==
- Desert island
- List of islands
