= Mekiro =

Island in French Polynesia

Coordinates: 23.1743°S 134.9210°W

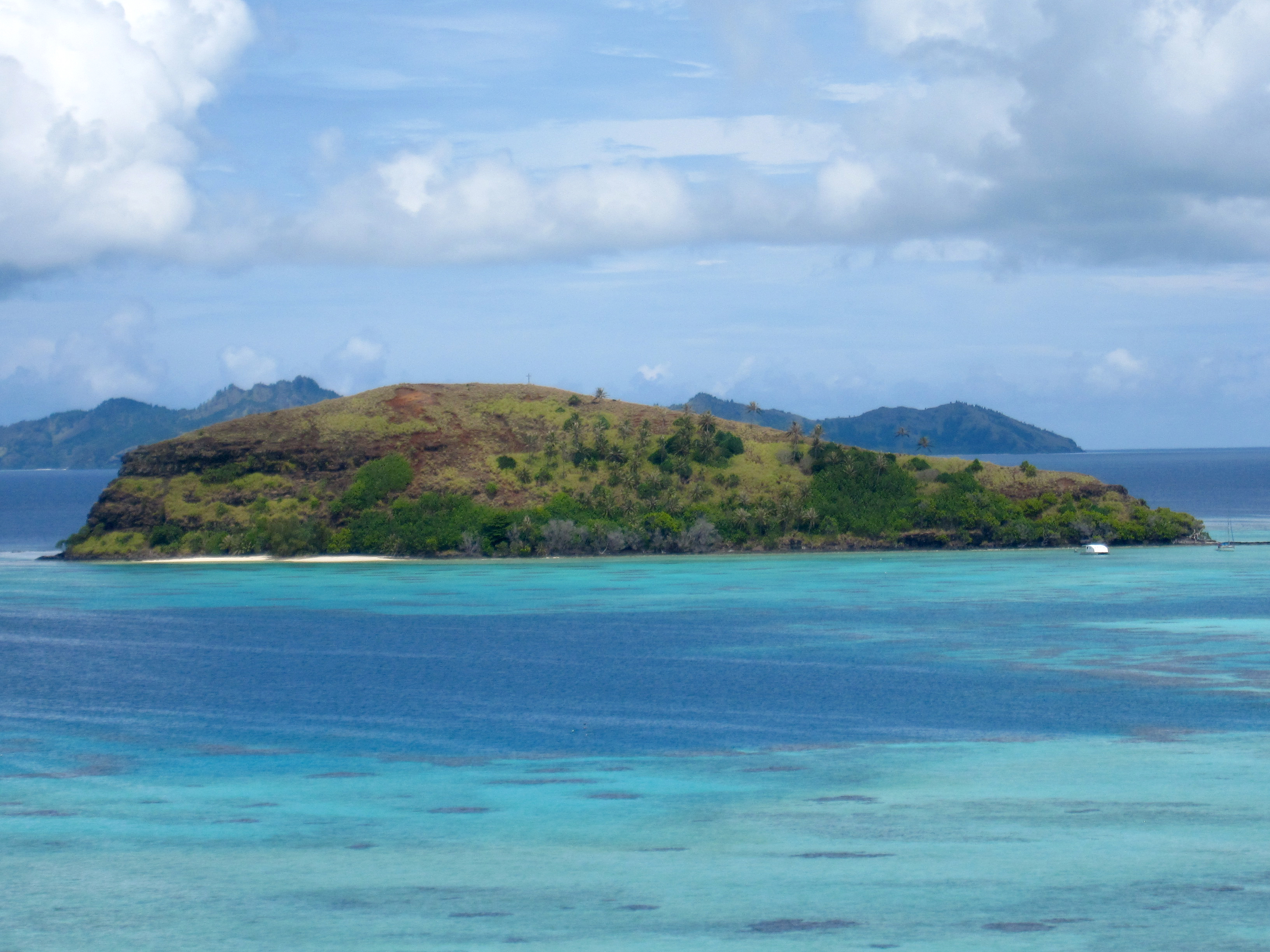
Mekiro island

Mekiro is an island of the Gambier Islands of French Polynesia. The islands of Gambier also include Mangareva, Taravai, Agakauitai, Akamaru, Aukena and Kamakawhich. Mangareva is the largest island of the whole Gambier Islands archipelago.

== See also ==
- Desert island
- List of islands
