= Tekava =

Island in French Polynesia

Coordinates: 23.1647°S 134.8527°W

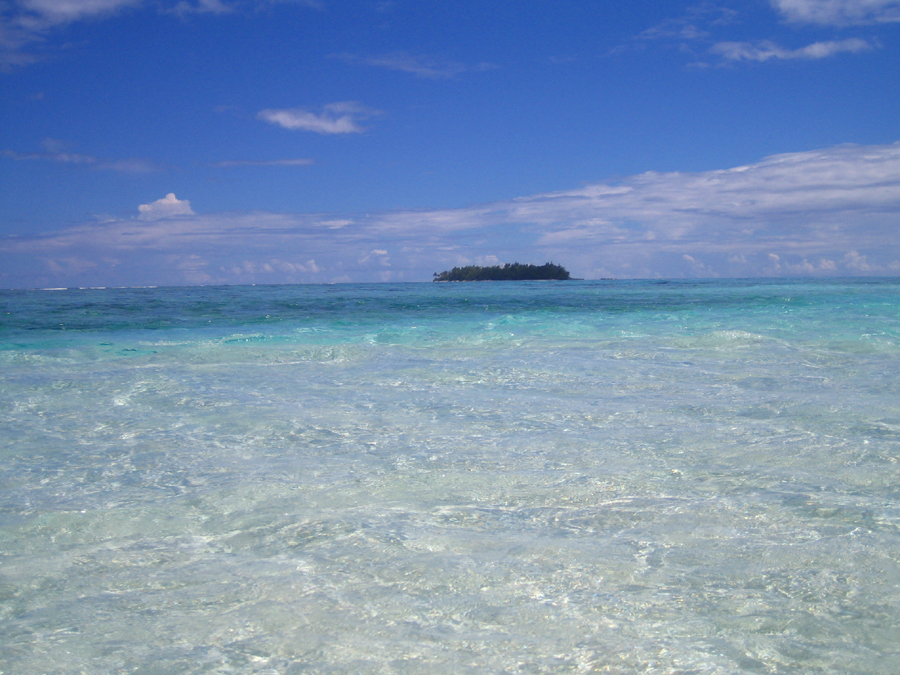
View of Tekava Island

Tekava is an island of the Gambier Islands of French Polynesia.

== See also ==
- Desert island
- List of islands
