= Angakauitai =

Island in French Polynesia

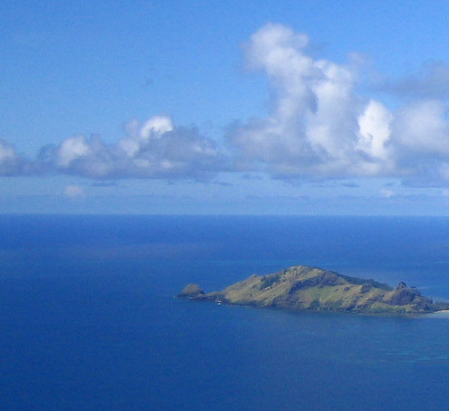
- Angakauitai Island

- Location within French Polynesia

Geography
- Location: Pacific Ocean
- Coordinates: 23°9′55″S 135°2′6″W
- Archipelago: Tuamotus
- Area: 0.7 km^{2} (0.27 sq mi)
- Highest elevation: 139 m (456 ft)
- Highest point: (unnamed)

Administration
- France
- Overseas collectivity: French Polynesia
- Administrative subdivision: Îles Tuamotu-Gambier
- Commune: Gambier

Demographics
- Population: 0 (2012)

Angakauitai is an island of the Gambier Islands of French Polynesia. It has an area of 0.7 km^{2} (0.27 sq mi) and its highest point is at 139 m. It is administratively a part of the Gambier Islands. It is uninhabited.

== See also ==
- Desert island
- List of islands
