= Tauna =

Island of French Polynesia

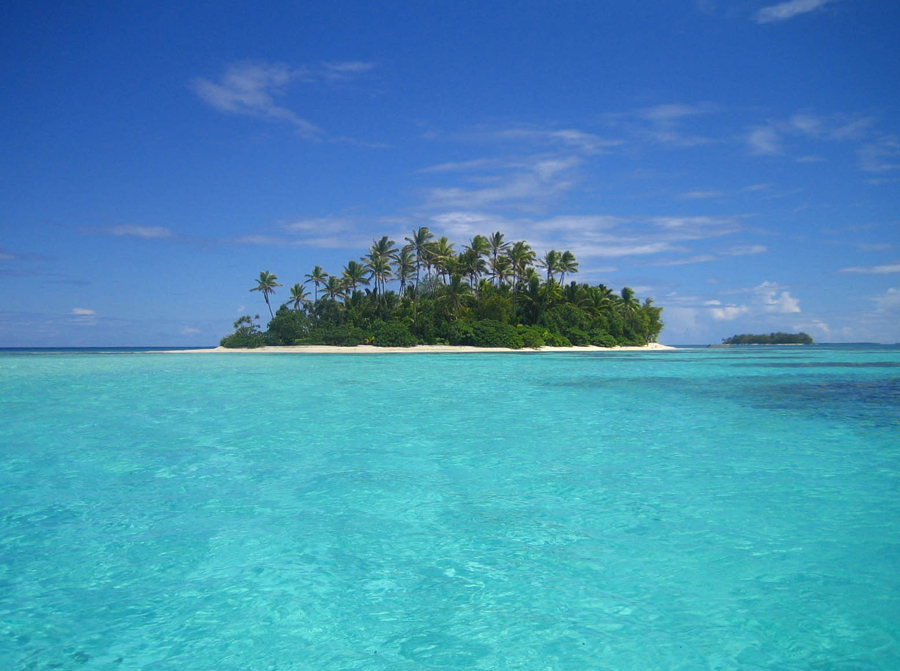

Geography
- Location: French Polynesia
- Coordinates: 23.1464°S 134.8518°W

Tauna is an islet in the Gambier Islands of French Polynesia.

In and around Polynesia, islets are commonly referred to as Motu, a term used for the coral-rubble islets typical of the region.

During a recent filming of the television show GT Hunters on Tauna in April 2014, the locals of the village of Rikitea began to unofficially refer to the small island as Motu Topher, after the cinematographer who fell deeply in love with the island.

== See also ==
- Desert island
- List of islands
