= Akamaru Island =

Island in French Polynesia

Akamaru
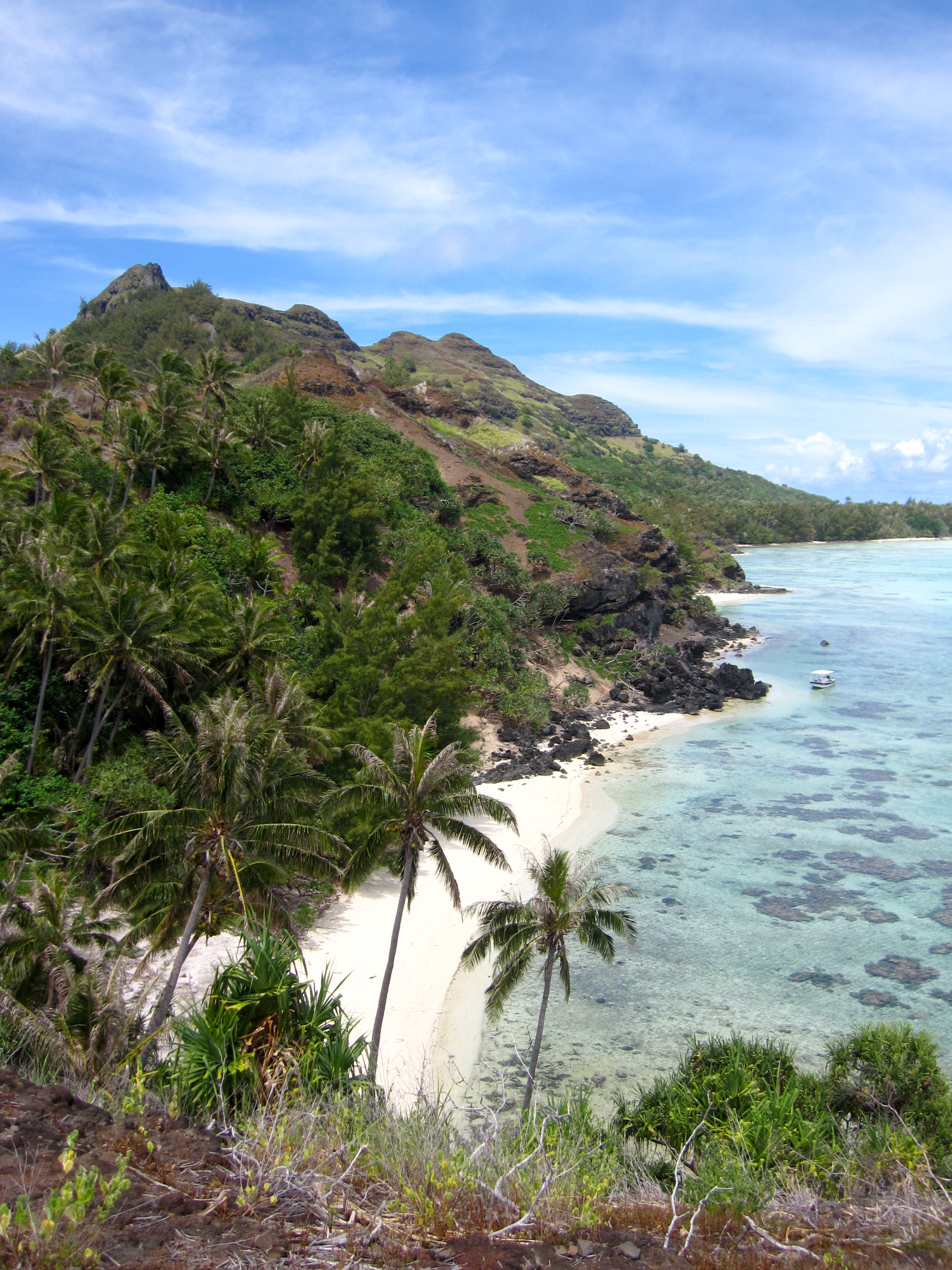
- View of Akamaru Island

- Location within French Polynesia

Geography
- Location: Pacific Ocean
- Coordinates: 23°10′52″S 134°54′56″W
- Archipelago: Tuamotus
- Area: 2.1 km^{2} (0.81 sq mi)
- Length: 2.8 km (1.74 mi)
- Width: 1.6 km (0.99 mi)
- Highest elevation: 247 m (810 ft)
- Highest point: (unnamed)

Administration
- France
- Overseas collectivity: French Polynesia
- Administrative subdivision: Îles Tuamotu-Gambier
- Commune: Gambier

Demographics
- Population: 22 (2012)
- Pop. density: 10/km^{2} (30/sq mi)

Akamaru is the third largest island in the Gambier Islands of French Polynesia. It is a small, rocky island with an area of approximately 2.6 km^{2} (1.0 sq mi). The island is located approximately 7 km (4.3 mi) southeast of Mangareva, which is the largest island of the whole Gambier Islands archipelago. Akamaru's highest point rises to an elevation of 247 m (810 ft).

The first European to arrive was the navigator James Wilson in 1797. In 1834, the French missionary Honoré Laval celebrated the first Mass on the island. The church of Notre-Dame de la Paix was built between 1835 and 1862. People from Mangareva sometimes visit to maintain the church and pick oranges in season. According to the 2012 census, there are 22 inhabitants.

The much smaller island of Mekiro is located just off (about 100 m) Akamaru's northwestern shore.

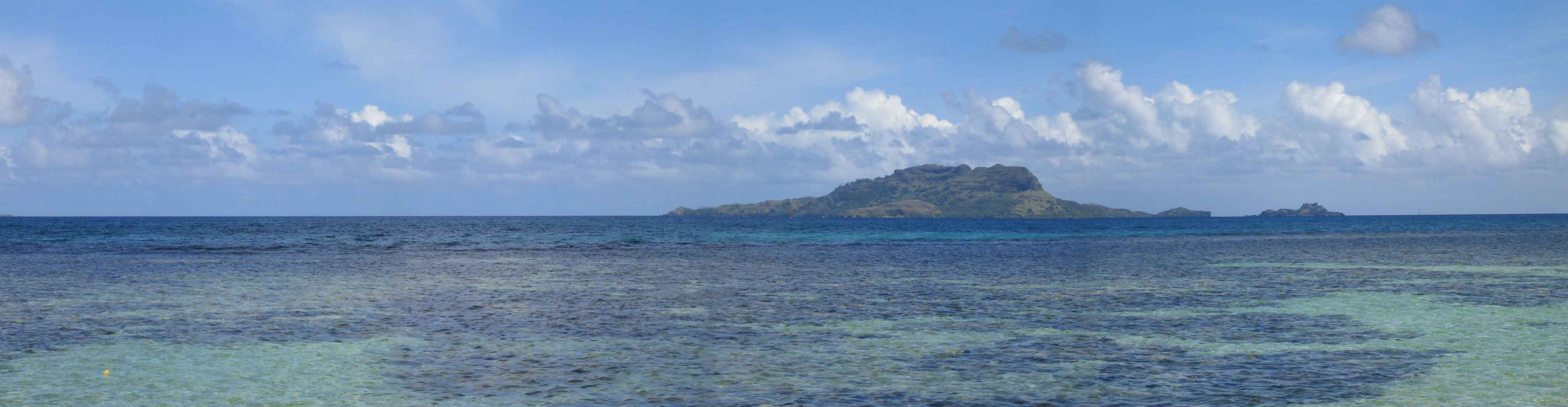
View on Akamaru island from Mangareva island

== Gallery ==
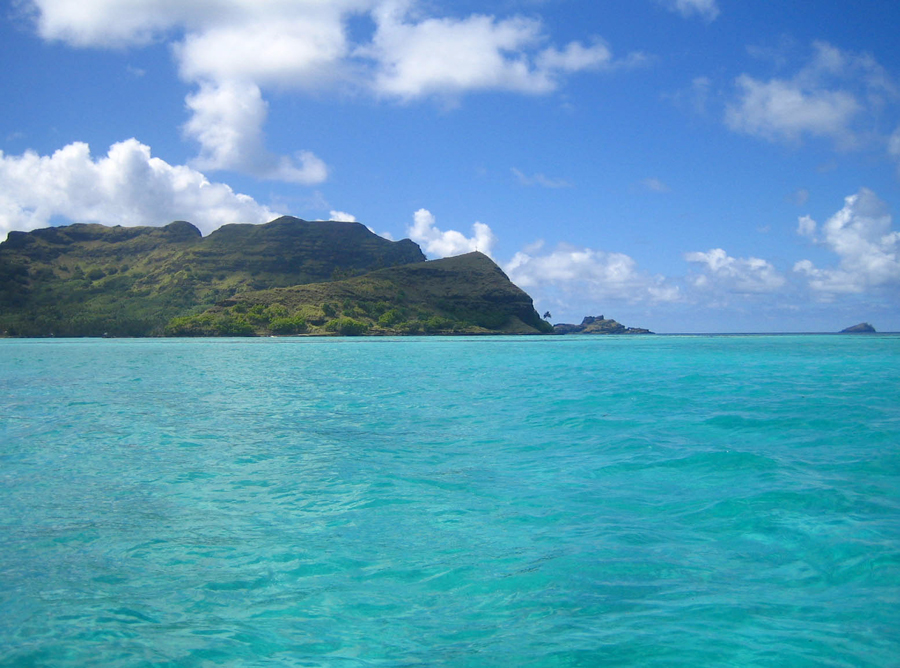
View of Akamaru and Mekiro

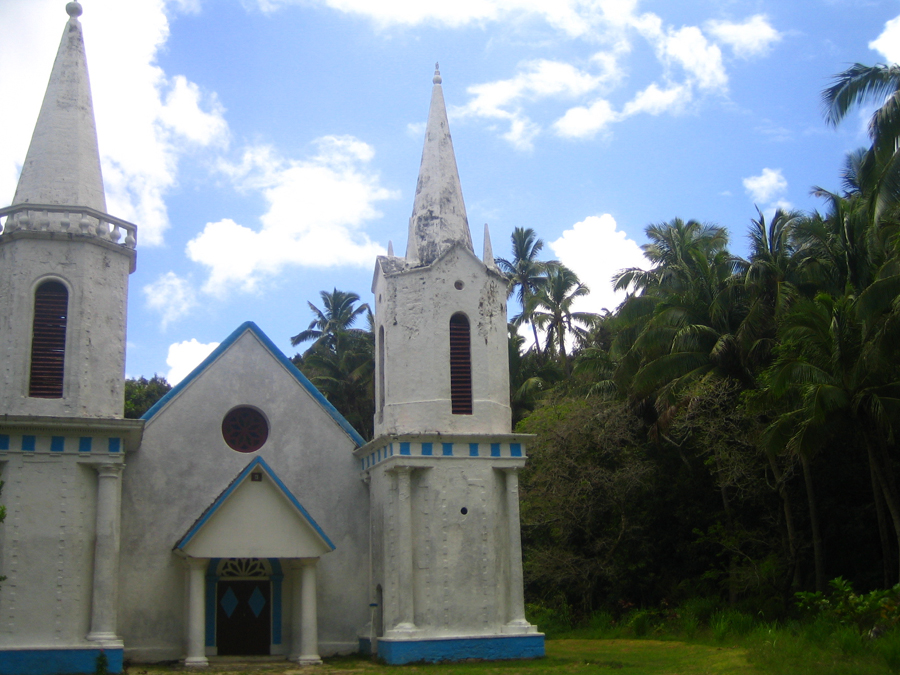
Church of Notre-Dame de la Paix

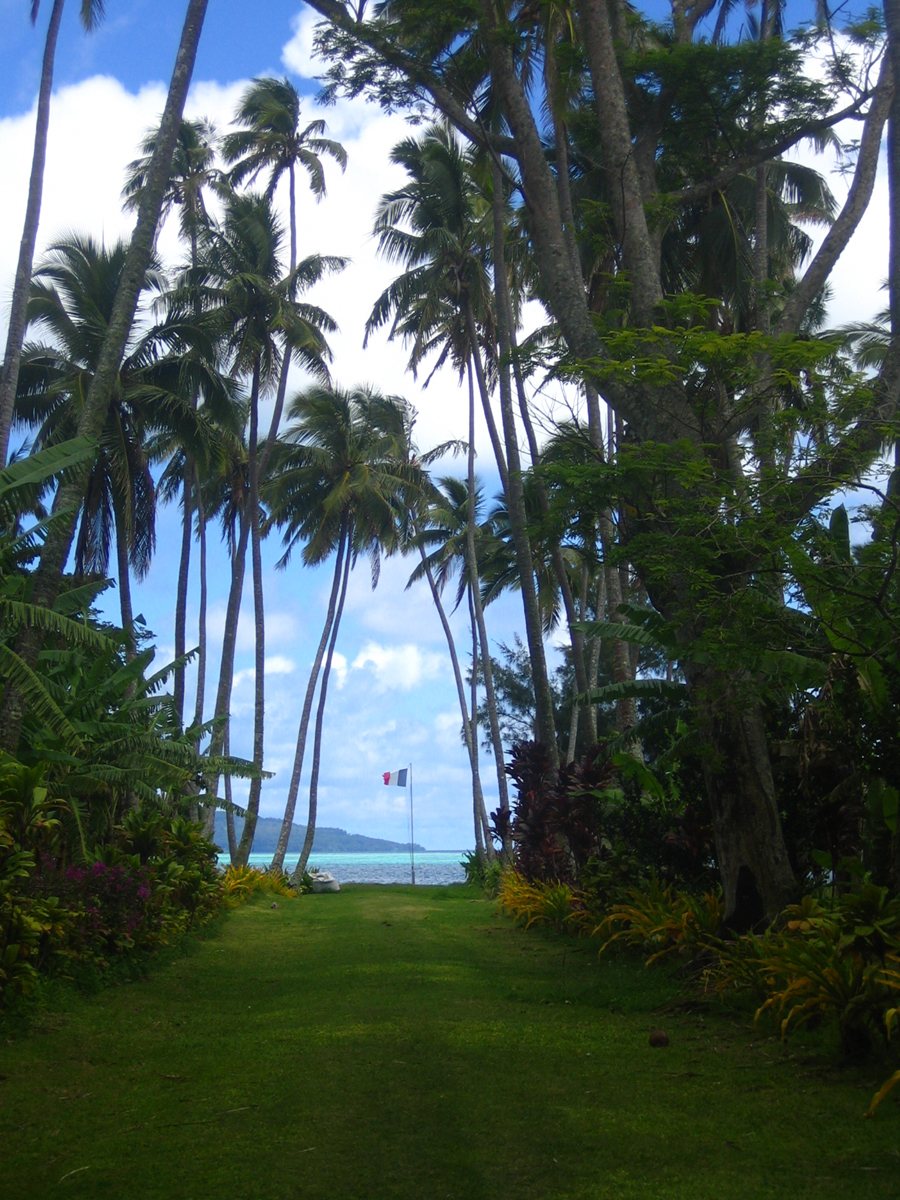
Alley of coconut trees

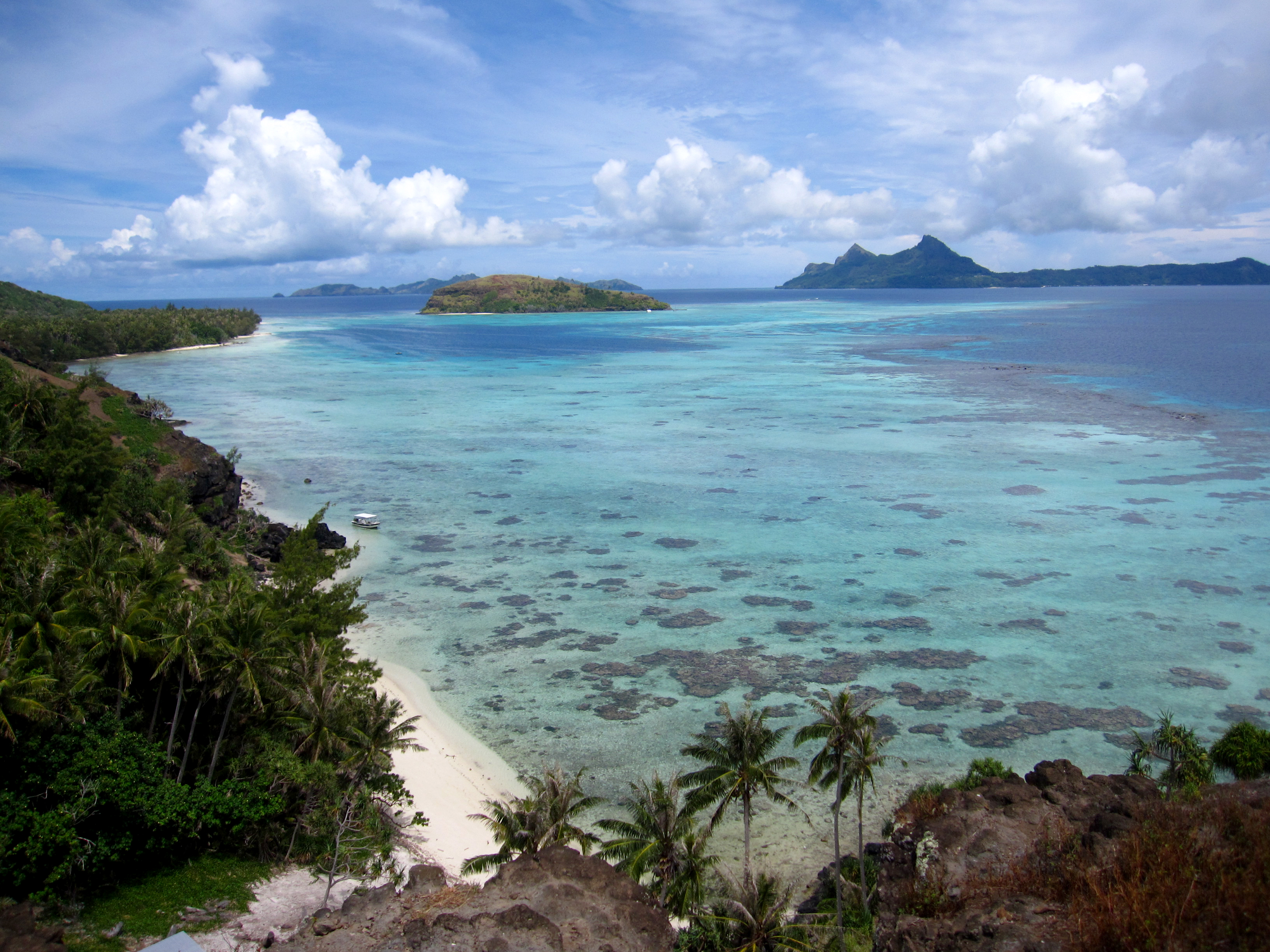
View on Mangareva island from Akamaru

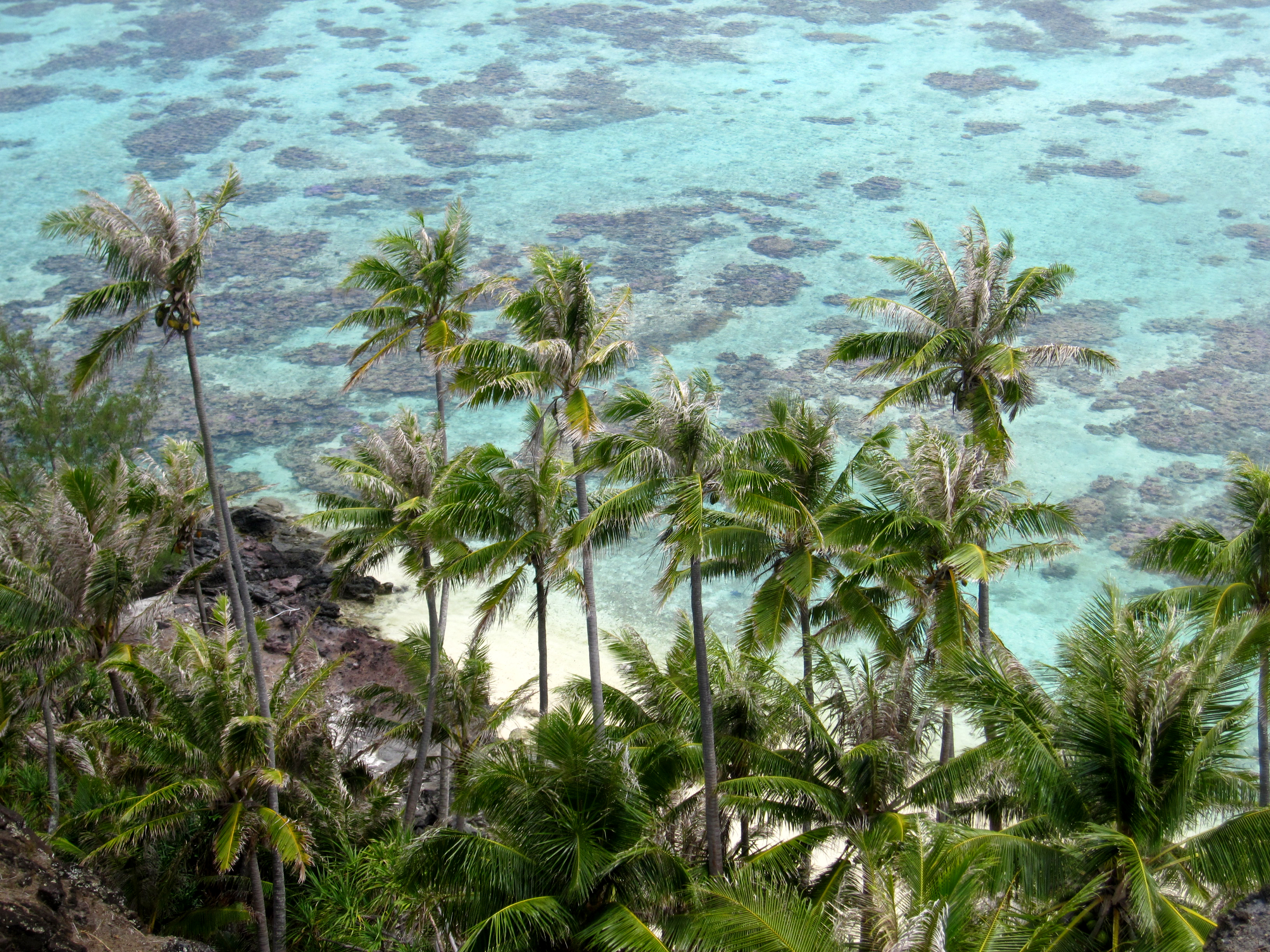
Palms
