= Manui =

Island in French Polynesia

Coordinates: 23.2319°S 134.9456°W

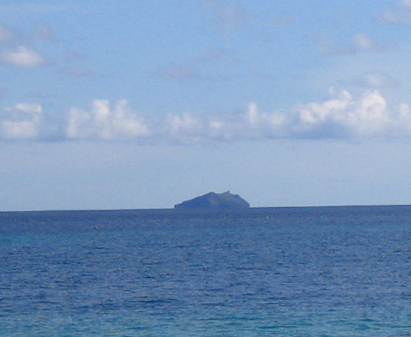
Manui island

Manui is an island of the Gambier Islands of French Polynesia.

In 2015 a conservation campaign resulted in the eradication of rats from the island.
