= Gambier Islands =

Archipelago in French Polynesia

Native name: Îles Gambier
- Flag of the Gambier Islands

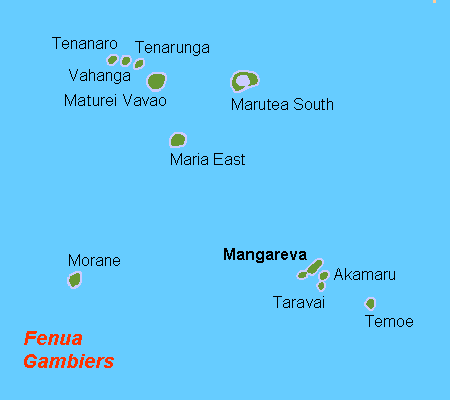
- Map of the commune of Gambier, showing to the north-west the islands that are part of the commune but belong to the Tuamotu Archipelago, and to the south-east the Gambier Islands proper (Mangareva, Akamaru, Taravai, Temoe).

Geography
- Location: Pacific Ocean
- Coordinates: 23°07′S 134°58′W
- Archipelago: Polynesia
- Total islands: 14
- Major islands: Mangareva, Akamaru, Aukena, Taravai
- Area: 27.8 km^{2} (10.7 sq mi)

Administration
- France
- Collectivity: French Polynesia
- Largest settlement: Rikitea

Demographics
- Population: 1,431 (Aug. 2017)
- Pop. density: 51/km^{2} (132/sq mi)

Additional information
- Time zone: UTC-9

Location of the Gambier Islands in the Pacific Ocean

The Gambier Islands (French: Îles Gambier or Archipel des Gambier) are an archipelago in French Polynesia, located at the southeast terminus of the Tuamotu archipelago. They cover an area of 27.8 km^{2} or 10.7 sq mi, and are made up of the Mangareva Islands, a group of high islands remnants of a caldera along with islets on the surrounding fringing reef, and the uninhabited Temoe atoll, which is located 45 km (28 mi) south-east of the Mangareva Islands. The Gambiers are generally considered a separate island group from Tuamotu both because their culture and language (Mangarevan) are much more closely related to those of the Marquesas Islands, and because, while the Tuamotus comprise several chains of coral atolls, the Mangareva Islands are of volcanic origin with central high islands.

Administratively, the Gambier Islands are inside the commune of Gambier, which also includes several atolls in the Tuamotu Archipelago. The town hall (mairie) of the commune of Gambier is located on Mangareva, which is the largest island in the Gambier Islands group.

The population of the Gambier Islands was 1,431 people at the 2017 census, all living in the Mangareva Islands.

== History ==
=== Pre-European history ===
Ethnologist Kenneth P. Emory of the Bishop Museum in Honolulu assumed that the Gambier Islands, like the other islands of East Polynesia, were colonized from the Marquesas. However, it is now more likely that settlement originated in the Society Islands around 1000 A.D. There is archaeological evidence that the islands of Mangareva, Taravai, Agakauitai, Akamaru, Aukena and Kamaka were colonized by Polynesians in protohistoric times. The social form was a strictly stratified tribal society, with constant inter-clan warfare and intermittent food shortages; cannibalism was not unknown. There is evidence that, shortly before European influence, unrest was taking place that led to turmoil and civil war between the social classes. This social upheaval may have greatly facilitated the conquest of the archipelago by King Pomaré II of Tahiti in the early 19th century. Until the second half of the 19th century, the archipelago remained in the sphere of influence of the Pomaré royal dynasty of Tahiti.

=== European exploration and colonization ===
The Gambier Islands were discovered for Europe in 1797 by James Wilson, captain of the ship Duff of the London Missionary Society, which had left Great Britain to carry out missionary work in Tahiti, Tonga and the Marquesas. He named the islands after his role model, the Huguenot James Gambier, who had financially supported the expedition.

In 1825, the British Frederick William Beechey reached the Gambier Islands with his ship HMS Blossom during a long voyage of exploration to the Pacific and Arctic of North America.

In 1834 the missionaries of the Congregation of the Sacred Hearts Honoré Laval and François Caret arrived in the islands to found the first Catholic mission in Polynesia, after the failed attempt of the Spaniards in Tahiti in 1775. The two priests ended up being protagonists of the French union of Tahiti. At first, King Maputeoa, the penultimate king of Mangareva, resisted, but after attributing the recovery from a serious illness to the new god, he increasingly submitted to the influence of the Christian missionaries and was baptized in 1836.

First with the acquiescence and then with the active support of the ruler, the Picpusians deployed an extensive development program for the islands. Encouraged by their success, after baptizing the entire population of the Gambier Islands, they moved to Tahiti in 1836. On this island, since Wilson's expedition, there was a Protestant mission led by Pritchard, who was also British consul and advisor to Queen Pomare Vahine. Pritchard succeeded in expelling the Catholic missionaries, provoking a diplomatic conflict. France sent Admiral Dupetit-Thouars to try to remedy the matter. The admiral ended up establishing a protectorate, and later the annexation of Tahiti.

Meanwhile, the Gambier Islands suffered a strong earthquake and tsunami in 1837. Laval and Caret returned to the archipelago and established a theocratic regime. But, most notably, they taught the inhabitants of the islands to read and write, and protected them from European traders and whalers. According to a phrase of Father Laval, "civilization leads to contentment".

On the other hand, religious zeal led them to systematically replace all the idols and temples, and in their place they ordered the construction of more than a hundred stone buildings: churches, chapels, convents, seminaries, cemeteries, vicarages, triumphal arches. The cathedral of St. Michael in Mangareva alone could accommodate more than 2,000 people. The population, which was over 2,000 when Laval and Caret left, dropped to 500 at the end of the 19th century due to disease and emigration. Many laborers were sent from Mangareva to Tahiti to build the cathedral of Papeete in 1856.

The recruitment of labor for the large-scale projects depopulated the smaller Gambier Islands and led according to some sources to famine, as daily food procurement was neglected. This and the spread of previously unknown infectious diseases led to destitution and a drastic decline in population. On the other hand, the missionaries suppressed constant tribal warfare, as well as human sacrifice and combated cannibalism.

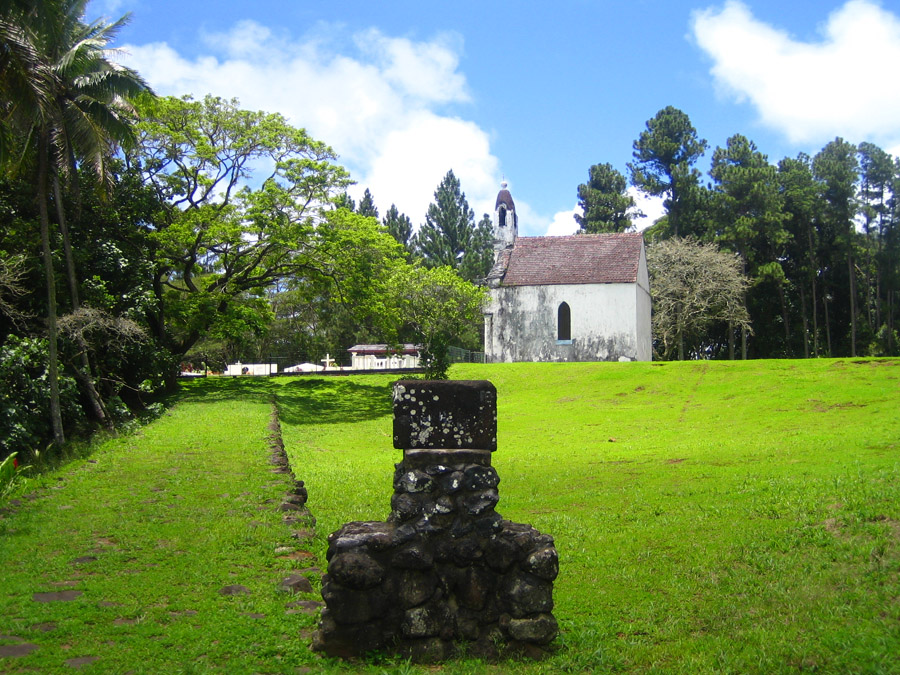
St. Peter's Catholic Chapel, Rikitea, where King Joseph Gregory and his father Maputeoa are buried.

The French governor of Tahiti stood by and watched the actions on the islands for many years. Only when complaints from businessmen and merchant ships became more frequent did he intervene. Father Laval had to leave Mangareva in 1871 at the urging of the Bishop of Tahiti, Florentin Etienne "Tepano" Jaussen. He died on 1 November 1880, and was buried in Tahiti.

The Gambier Islands were finally annexed on 21 February 1881 under Prince Regent Bernardo Putairi and approved by the President of France on 30 January 1882.

=== Effects of French nuclear testing ===
The Gambiers served as a logistical staging base for French nuclear testing activity in Mururoa, approximately 400 kilometers away. During this time, the French military dragged a chain through some of the coral reef beds to cut a wider and deeper channel for deep draft vessels. Higher rate of infections by ciguatera were subsequently recorded.

== Geography ==
The Gambier Islands include the Mangareva Islands (the Gambier Islands proper), which have an enclosing coral reef which is broken by only three passages to the open sea, and Temoe atoll, which is located 45 km (28 mi) south-east of the Mangareva Islands. In the Mangareva Islands, besides Mangareva proper (the main island), the other notable high islands of the group are Akamaru, Angakauitai, Aukena, Kamaka, Kouaku, Makapu, Makaroa, Manui, Mekiro and Taravai. These are primarily of volcanic origin. A number of others are actually coral islands, hence of secondary volcanic origin, including Papuri, Puaumu, Totengengie and the Tokorua group.

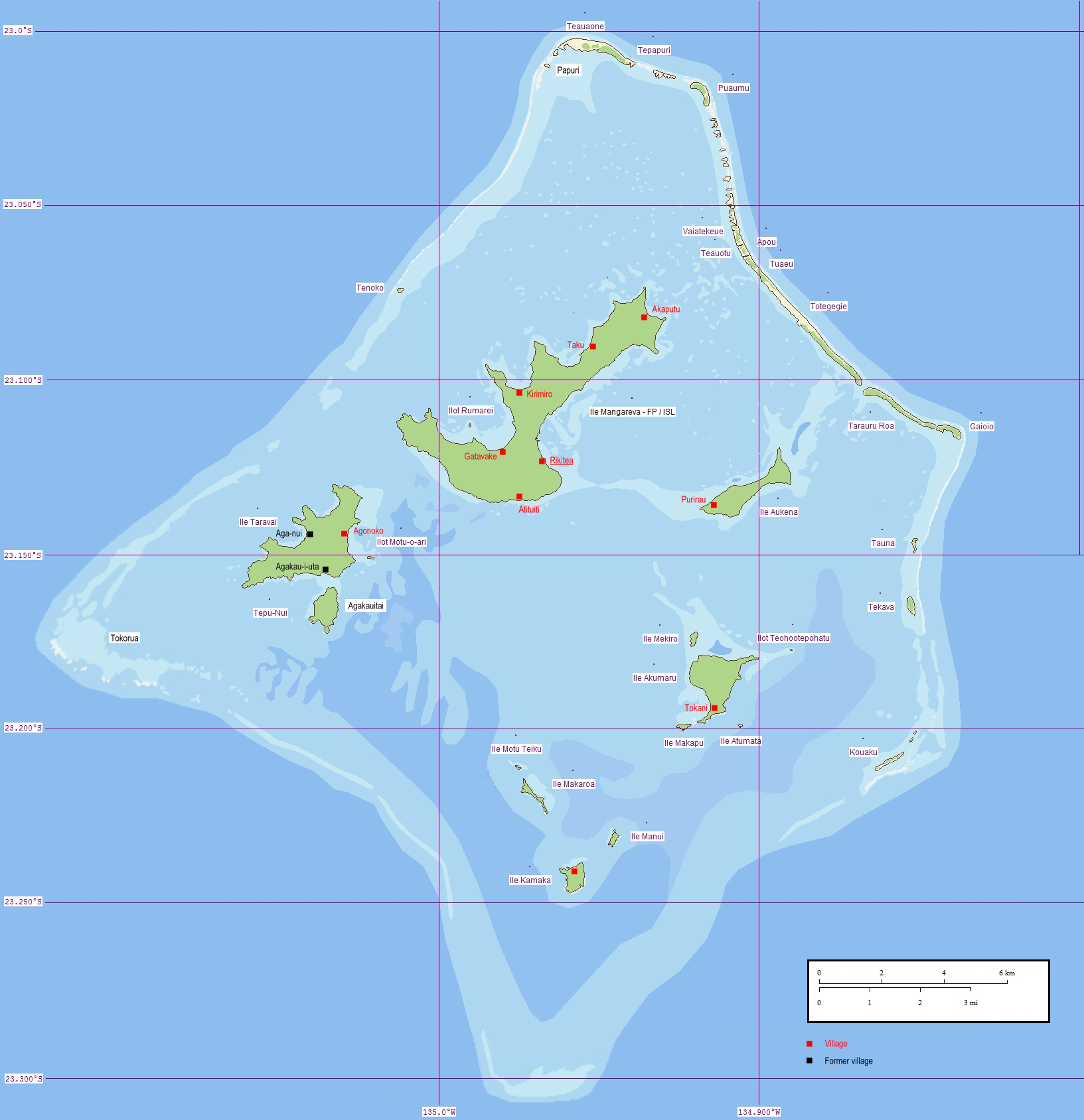
Mangareva Islands

The Mangareva Islands have a land area of 25.71 km^{2}, with a population of 1,431 people at the 2017 census. The primary town is Rikitea, located on Mangareva, as is the highest point in the Gambiers, Mt. Duff, rising to 441 metres (1,447 ft) along that island's south coast.

The islands of Gambier comprise:

- Temoe atoll (2.1 km²; uninhabited): one main island and a dozen motus separated by passes over the coral reef, 45 km (28 mi) south-east of the Mangareva Islands.
- Mangareva Islands (25.71 km²; 1,431 inh. at 2017 census)
  - islands in the central lagoon (only high islands are permanently inhabited):
    - to the north, the high island of Mangareva (13.93 km², the largest island of the atoll; 1,384 inh. at 2017 census), and the islet of Rumarei;
    - to the north-east, the high island of Aukena (1.41 km²; 25 inh. at 2017 census);
    - to the south-east, the high island of Akamaru (1.96 km²; 12 inh. at 2017 census), the two smaller islands Makapu (0.04 km²; uninhabited), Mekiro (0.07 km²; uninhabited), and the two islets of Atumata, Teohootepohatu;
    - to the south, the high island of Kamaka (0.47 km²; 1 inh. at 2017 census), the two smaller islands of Makaroa (0.17 km²; uninhabited), Manui (0.08 km²; uninhabited), and the islet of Motu Teiku (0.01 km²; uninhabited);
    - to the west, the high islands of Taravai (4,96 km²; 8 inh. at 2017 census) and Angakauitai (0.76 km²; 1 inh. at 2017 census), and the islets of Tepu Nui and Motu-O-Ari;
  - low islands on the coral reef (none of them are inhabited):
    - to the north-west, the islet of Tenoko;
    - to the north, the islet of Papuri; the three islands of Teauaone, Tepapuri and Puaumu;
    - to the north-east, the four islets of Vaiatekeue, Teauotu, Apou, and Tuaeu; the three islands of Totegegie (location of the Totegegie Airport), Tarauru Roa, Gaioio;
    - to the east, the two islets of Tauna and Tekava;
    - to the south-east, the island of Kouaku;
    - to the west, the reef of Tokorua (occasionally emerging).

=== Climate ===
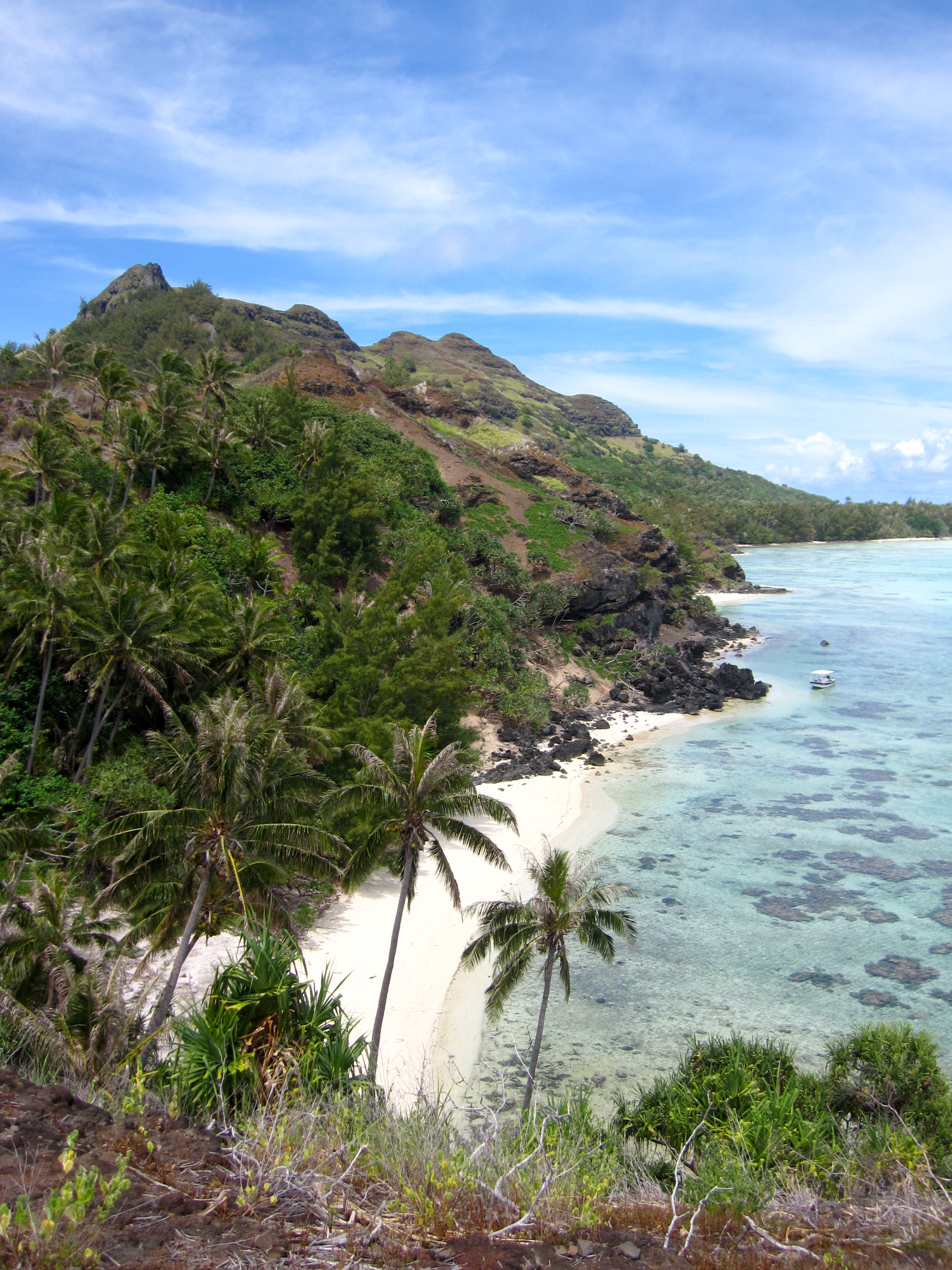
Akamaru Island

The Gambier Islands have a typical maritime climate, tropical in character but relatively cool. Rainfall is relatively constant throughout the year. Temperatures are similar to those of the Austral Islands, with a warm season from November to April and a cool season from May to October. The minimum and maximum temperatures recorded at Gambier (Rikitea meteorological station; station météorologique de Rikitea) are 13.2 °C (27 August 1992) and 31.2 °C (23 January 1989).

Climate data for Mangareva, Gambier Islands (1991–2020 averages, extremes 1980–present)
Month	Jan	Feb	Mar	Apr	May	Jun	Jul	Aug	Sep	Oct	Nov	Dec	Year
Record high °C (°F)	31.2 (88.2)	30.8 (87.4)	31.4 (88.5)	30.9 (87.6)	29.6 (85.3)	27.5 (81.5)	26.9 (80.4)	28.1 (82.6)	27.7 (81.9)	28.5 (83.3)	29.1 (84.4)	30.1 (86.2)	31.4 (88.5)
Mean daily maximum °C (°F)	28.0 (82.4)	28.3 (82.9)	28.4 (83.1)	27.0 (80.6)	25.4 (77.7)	24.1 (75.4)	23.4 (74.1)	23.5 (74.3)	23.8 (74.8)	24.6 (76.3)	25.8 (78.4)	27.0 (80.6)	25.8 (78.4)
Daily mean °C (°F)	25.5 (77.9)	25.8 (78.4)	26.0 (78.8)	24.9 (76.8)	23.4 (74.1)	22.2 (72.0)	21.4 (70.5)	21.3 (70.3)	21.5 (70.7)	22.3 (72.1)	23.5 (74.3)	24.7 (76.5)	23.5 (74.3)
Mean daily minimum °C (°F)	23.1 (73.6)	23.4 (74.1)	23.6 (74.5)	22.7 (72.9)	21.4 (70.5)	20.3 (68.5)	19.5 (67.1)	19.1 (66.4)	19.3 (66.7)	20.1 (68.2)	21.2 (70.2)	22.3 (72.1)	21.3 (70.3)
Record low °C (°F)	18.5 (65.3)	19.3 (66.7)	18.3 (64.9)	17.8 (64.0)	16.0 (60.8)	15.6 (60.1)	13.9 (57.0)	13.2 (55.8)	14.6 (58.3)	14.4 (57.9)	16.6 (61.9)	15.7 (60.3)	13.2 (55.8)
Average precipitation mm (inches)	187.4 (7.38)	175.3 (6.90)	167.2 (6.58)	164.8 (6.49)	174.1 (6.85)	155.6 (6.13)	127.9 (5.04)	135.3 (5.33)	119.9 (4.72)	153.7 (6.05)	165.8 (6.53)	186.5 (7.34)	1,913.5 (75.33)
Average precipitation days (≥ 1.0 mm)	14.9	13.2	13.1	12.3	12.3	12.1	12.5	11.2	10.7	11.4	11.3	13.6	148.6
Mean monthly sunshine hours	216.7	194.4	203.5	155.3	142.5	123.4	135.7	154.8	150.7	164.7	174.1	180.5	1,996.1
Source: Météo-France

=== Flora and fauna ===
The volcanic islands are covered with lush tropical vegetation. The windward side of Mount Duff is dry grassland.

The fringing reef coral islands are species-poor due to poor soil fertility. Here mainly coconut trees (Cocos nucifera) thrive, which are used economically for a small copra production.

The fauna of the coral islands, poor in species, is limited to birds, insects and lizards. In contrast, the underwater fauna is species-rich. All kinds of coral fish make the lagoon a paradise for divers.

=== Geology ===
The Gambier Islands formed from a hot spot under the Pacific Plate, which is moving northwestward at a rate of 12.5 cm per year. They are part of an atoll that formed between 5.6 and 5.7 million years ago. The central island has already partially subsided, so that ancient parts of the crater rim still protrude from the water as islands of igneous rocks. The long-sunken caldera can still be noted by the position of the islands in the lagoon.

The entire group sits on an underwater rise that sinks relatively rapidly in the south and east, so that the 65 km long fringing reef only rises above the water surface on three sides. From there, numerous low motus, composed of coral sand and rubble, rise just above the sea surface.

== Economy ==
Today, pearl farming is widely practiced in the Gambier lagoons, whose relatively cold waters allow the production of quality pearls. There are 129 pearl farms, including fourteen companies. In recent years, although far from the large population centers of French Polynesia, the archipelago has seen its population increase thanks to pearl farming and the exploitation of mother-of-pearl.

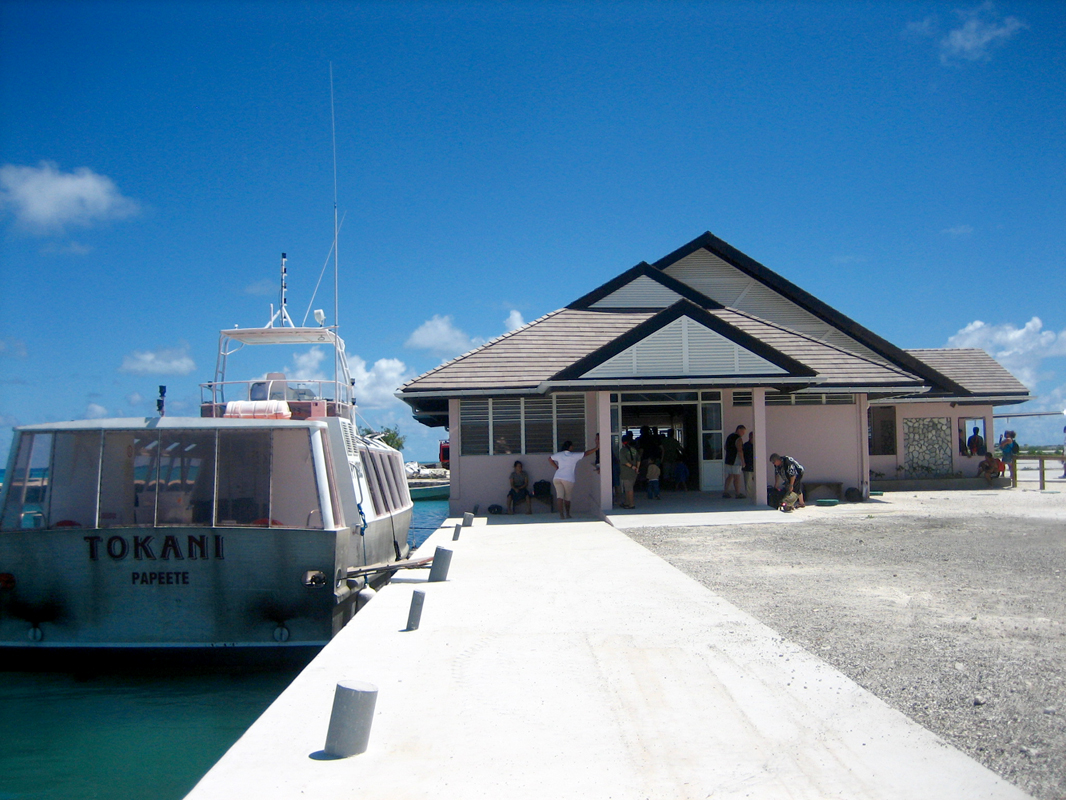
Totegegie Airport, Gambier Islands

In terms of tourism, the Gambier archipelago is one of the least visited in French Polynesia. The remoteness of Tahiti and the price of airfare to get there are largely responsible for this, but the islands have potential because of their climate, environment and unique historical past. A few sailboats call at Rikitea Bay and tourists wishing to visit the British Pitcairn Islands pass through Mangareva as a base.

Local production in the Gambier Islands is limited to a few productive sectors, such as subsistence farming and fishing, and most consumer goods are transported by a cargo service operated by two schooners, which rotate every three weeks.

The inhabitants are self-sufficient. They grow yams, taro and breadfruit, as well as all kinds of tropical fruits and, to a lesser extent, coffee for export.

== Politics and government ==
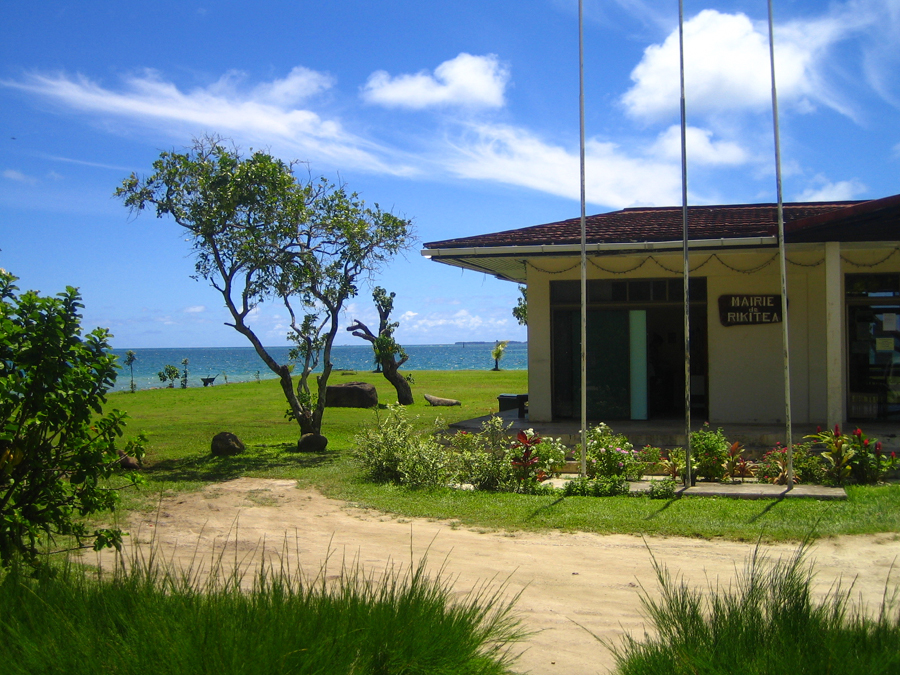
Rikitea Town Hall

Politically, the Gambier Islands belong to French Polynesia. They form one of 17 municipalities (Commune des Gambier) administered by a subdivision (Subdivision administrative des Tuamotu-Gambier) of the High Commissariat of French Polynesia (Haut-commissariat de la République en Polynésie française) in Papeete, Tahiti. In addition to the Gambier Islands in the geographical sense (i.e. including the atolls of Gambier and Temoe), the following atolls in the southeast of the Tuamotu archipelago belong to the municipality of Gambier:

- Maturei Vavao Atoll
- Tenararo Atoll
- Tenarunga (or Tenania) Atoll
- Vahanga Atoll
- Maria Atoll
- Marutea Sud Atoll
- Morane Atoll

The municipality of Gambier had a total population of 1,421 inhabitants according to 2012 data, with a population density of 43 p.e./km^{2}.

The official language is French. The currency is (still) the CFP franc, which is pegged to the euro. The administrative budget of the Gambier Islands is largely subsidized with funds from France and the European Union.

The main island is Mangareva, on which, however, only the seat of the local administration is located.

== Demographics ==
The Gambier Islands had a population of 1,431 inhabitants at the 2017 census.

The population was spread over the following islands:

- Temoe atoll: uninhabited
- Mangareva Islands:
  - Mangareva Island proper: 1,384
  - Aukena Island: 25
  - Akamaru Island: 12
  - Taravai Island: 8
  - Angakauitai Island: 1
  - Kamaka Island: 1

=== Historical population ===
Historical population
Year	Pop.	±% p.a.
1983	553	—
1988	612	+2.09%
1996	873	+4.54%
2002	907	+0.62%
2007	1,098	+4.08%
2012	1,310	+3.59%
2017	1,431	+1.79%
Official population figures from the French Polynesian censuses.

== Religion ==
The majority of the islands' population follows Christianity, mostly the Catholic Church and various Protestant groups, a legacy of the missionary activity that began with the arrival of Europeans to the region. According to 1991 data, between 5 and 6% of the population belonged to a Protestant Christian group.

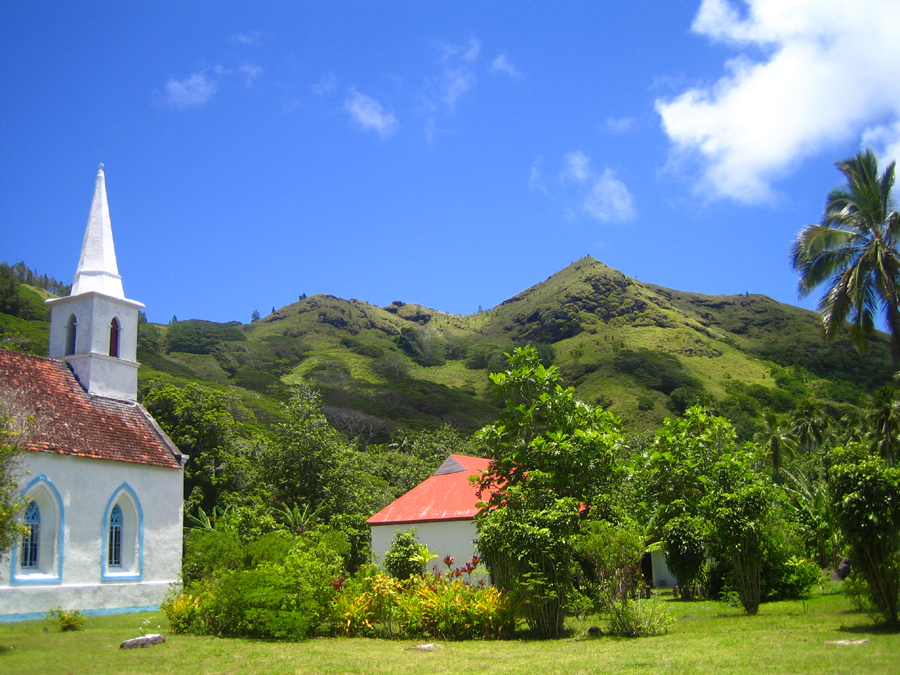
St. Gabriel's Church in Taravai

Recently restored after years of closure, the former cathedral of St. Michael of Mangareva, in the Gambier archipelago, bears witness to the time when the first Catholic missionaries settled there in the 19th century. It is a building protected as a historical monument of France. The structure is considered one of the centers of Catholicism in Polynesia.

The activity of the Catholic Church was boosted by the Missionary work of the Congregation of the Sacred Hearts of Jesus and Mary of Picpus. The Catholic missionaries quickly converted almost the entire population. They constructed many religious buildings and had the marae, the places of worship of the ancient local gods, destroyed.

Today the Catholic Church administers 6 buildings in the region the Church of Saint Gabriel in Agonoko, Taravai (Église de Saint-Gabriel), the Church of Our Lady of Peace in Akamaru (Église de Notre-Dame-de-Paix), the Church of Saint Raphael in Aukena (Église de Saint-Raphaël), the Church of Saint Joseph of Taku in Mangareva (Église de Saint-Joseph-de-Taku), the Church of Saint Joseph in Marutea (Église de Saint-Joseph), and the aforementioned Ancient Cathedral of Saint Michael in Rikitea (Ancienne cathédrale Saint-Michel) (Eastern Oceania cathedral between 1833 and 1848).

== Culture ==
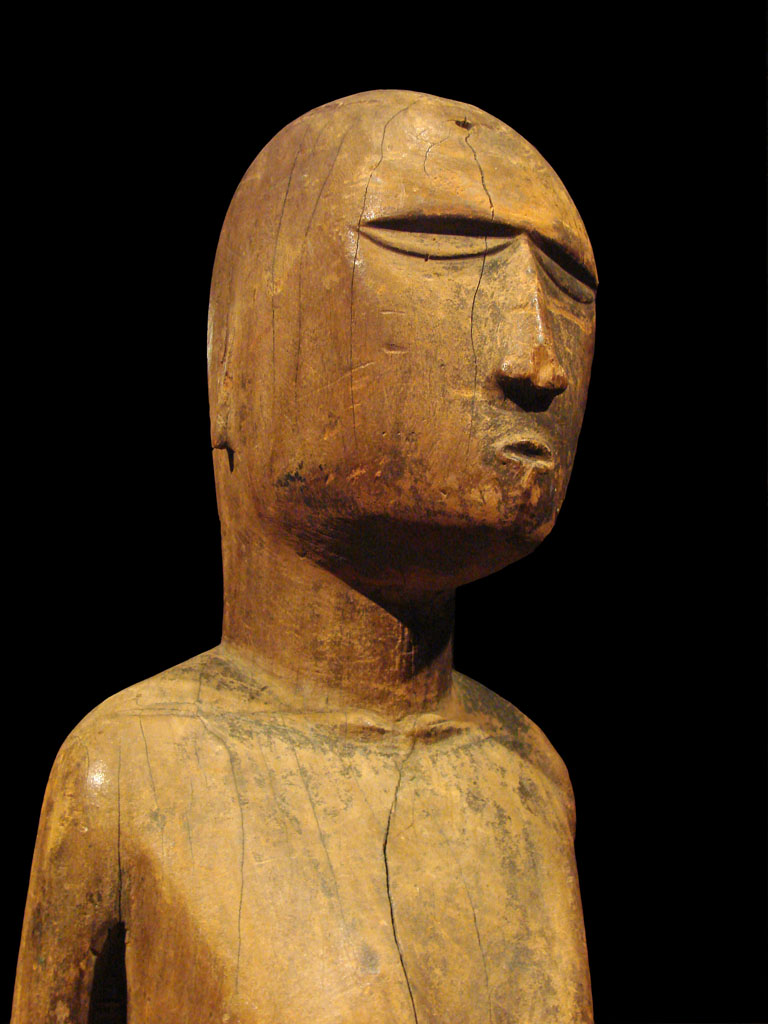
Effigy of an ancient deity (Ro'go), Mangareva Island, Gambier Archipelago

Little is known about the art and culture of the Gambier Islands before European influence. Ethnological studies on a scientific basis could not be carried out because the works of art were almost eliminated by the colonizers in a very short time. Father Laval claimed to have burned 40 wooden idols in a single day. The scant information that has survived on the religion and worship of the Gambier Islands comes mainly from letters written by the missionaries to their religious superiors.

A thatched hut twenty feet long, ten feet wide, and seven feet high contained the idols. In front of the structure was a space twenty feet square paved with hewn coral blocks and bordered with curbs. Inside the hut was a boundary one meter high along its entire length, in the center of which stood a finely carved and polished one meter high idol. The eyebrows, but not the eyes themselves, were molded and, from the way the figure was carved, one could deduce that no consideration had been given to human anatomy. The idol was placed in an upright position with its limbs attached to the wall of the hut. The head and loins were tied with a piece of white cloth and the feet were placed in a gourd filled with water. Next to the idol were various oars, mats, coils of rope and garments, obviously gifts for the deity. On each side of the idol were carved three-armed stands on which were presented various objects, such as decorated coconut shells and pieces of bamboo, possibly intended to represent musical instruments.

— Frederick William Beechey, Narrative of a voyage to the Pacific and Beering’s strait

Only eight artifacts from the pre-European period from the Gambier Islands remain in the world, including a carved deity of the type described by Beechey in the above text in the Musée national des Arts d'Afrique et d'Océanie in Paris. The wooden figure, about a meter high and only remotely human, represents the god Rao, supposedly the "god of inequity" according to Father Caret's description, the third most important deity in the Mangareva pantheon.

A four-armed stand, like the one described in the text fragment above, is on display at the Musée de l'Homme in Paris. Another naturalistic statue, approximately one meter high, in the Metropolitan Museum of Art in New York, is believed to represent the god Rogo, the sixth son of Tagaroa and Haumea, the mythical founders of Mangareva. Rogo was the ancient deity of peace and hospitality and was revealed as a rainbow. His cult was associated with the cultivation of turmeric.

=== Languages ===
At the 2017 census, only 24.8% of the population age 15 and older in the Gambier Islands still reported that Mangarevan was the language they spoke the most at home (down from 38.6% at the 2007 census), while 62.6% reported French as the main language spoken at home (up from 52.3% at the 2007 census), 4.9% reported Tahitian (down from 6.4% in 2007), and 4.6% reported some Chinese dialects (predominantly Hakka) (up from 3.5% in 2007).

In the Gambier Islands, the number of people age 15 and older who reported that the language they spoke the most at home was Mangarevan declined from 300 at the 2007 census to 270 at the 2017 census. In the entire French Polynesia, the number of people age 15 and older who reported that the language they spoke the most at home was Mangarevan declined from 424 at the 2007 census to 332 at the 2017 census. Most of the people who spoke Mangarevan at home outside of the Gambier Islands at the 2017 census lived in Tahiti.

Speakers have some bilingualism in Tahitian, in which there is a 60% lexical similarity, and usually with French, as well. It is a member of the Marquesic subgroup, and as such is closely related to Hawaiian and Marquesan.

According to the Endangered Languages Project, Mangarevan is considered endangered with fewer than 900 speakers out of an ethnic population of 1,491. The larger portion of the population in the Gambier Islands speak French.

== See also ==
- List of non-marine molluscs of the Gambier Islands
- List of monarchs of Mangareva
