= Akakio Tematereikura =

Regent of Mangareva (d. 1869)

Regent of Mangareva
- Tenure: 1869
- Predecessor: Maria Eutokia Toaputeitou
- Successor: Arone Teikatoara
- Died: 24 August 1869
- Spouse: Agnès Toamani
- Issue: Agapa; Maria-Tepano Teikatoara youngest son
- Father: Matua
- Mother: Toa-Matui
- Religion: Roman Catholicism

Akakio Tematereikura (died 1869) was the Prince Regent of the Polynesian island of Mangareva and other territories of the Gambier Islands, including Akamaru, Aukena, Taravai and Temoe, in 1869. He served as regent and de facto monarch during the interregnum period when the royal succession of Mangareva was in doubt. His name is also written as Akakio Matereikura in some French sources.

== Biography ==
Akakio Tematereikura was the son of Matua, the high priest of Mangareva, and his wife Toa-Matui. He was also a cousin of King Maputeoa. He and his family were members of the royal togoʻiti class of chiefs of the island of Mangareva in the Gambier Islands. Christianity was introduced to the Gambier Islands in the 1830s by French Picpus priests, Honoré Laval and François Caret with the support of King Maputeoa and his father Matua. When King Maputeoa died on 20 June 1857. he was succeeded as King of Mangareva by his young son, Joseph Gregorio II, with his widow Queen Maria Eutokia Toaputeitou as regent. Akakio's daughter Agapa was chosen as the consort of the new king from a list of three noblewomen. However, she died young and King Joseph later died childless after an eleven-year reign.

Akakio married Agnès Toamani and had three known children. His daughter Agapa married King Joseph Gregorio II. He also had two sons: the youngest unnamed son was studying to be a priest before his father's death while his eldest son Maria-Tepano Teikatoara married Agnus Tepaïru, the sister of the king and eldest surviving child of King Maputeoa.

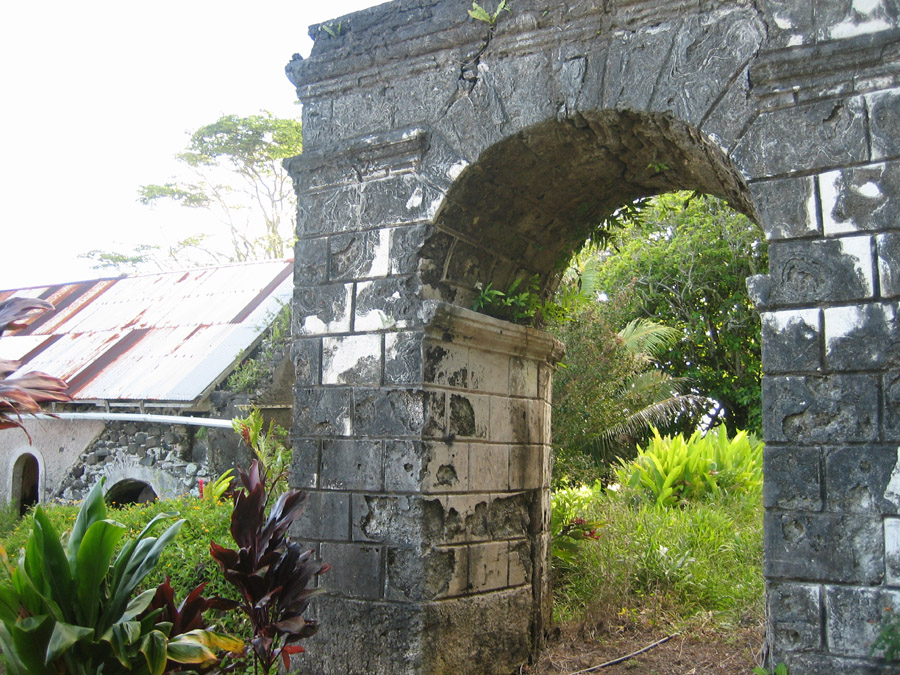
The ruins of Rouru Convent, where Queen Maria Eutokia Toaputeitou retired to in later life as a novice

After the untimely death of the king without issue in 1868, the succession of the throne was thrown into doubt. Traditionally only male heirs could ascend to the throne of Mangareva, so a regency was installed pending the birth of an heir from one of the king's two surviving sisters: Agnès (his daughter-in-law) and Philomèle. A series of regents ruled in the name of these two royal sisters. Initially, the queen dowager served as regent while Akakio presided as president of the regency council. In a report dated to 4 April 1869, French Lieutenant Xavier Caillet noted that Queen Maria Eutokia Toaputeito had resigned and retired to Rouru Convent, on Mount Duff, and Akakio had been chosen as her successor to the regency.

Akakio died on 24 August 1869, after receiving all the sacraments of the Catholic Church administered the French missionaries in Mangareva. The former queen regent had to come out of her religious retirement to attend to the political affair left by his death. She considered choosing Father Laval, the head of the Catholic mission, as the new regent and turu (guardian) of her two daughters but the French priest refused the offer. Instead, she selected Arone Teikatoara (the paternal uncles of her daughters) as Akakio's successor with the chiefs Bernardo Teoaiti, Agapito and Bernardo Putairi serving as his assistants. After the appointment, Queen Maria Eutokia Toaputeito returned to the Rouru convent and died there as a novice on 27 August 1869. The Gambier Islands steadily fell under colonial influence, becoming a French protectorate in 1871 and fully annexed to the territory of French Oceania in 1881, today part of the overseas country of French Polynesia.

== Bibliography ==
- Chopard, Jean Paul (1871). Quelques personnages officiels à Tahiti sous le règne de Napoléon III. Brest: J. B. Lefournier Ainé.
- Cuzent, Gilbert (1872). Voyage aux îles Gambier (Archipel de Mangarèva). Paris: V. Masson et Fils.
- Deschanel, Paul Eugene Louis (1888). Les intérêts français dans l'océan Pacifique. Paris: Berger-Levrault et cie.
- Garrett, John (1982). To Live Among the Stars: Christian Origins in Oceania. Suva, Fiji: Institute of Pacific Studies, University of the South Pacific. ISBN 978-2-8254-0692-2.
- Gonschor, Lorenz Rudolf (August 2008). Law as a Tool of Oppression and Liberation: Institutional Histories and Perspectives on Political Independence in Hawaiʻi, Tahiti Nui/French Polynesia and Rapa Nui (PDF) (MA thesis). Honolulu: University of Hawaii at Manoa. hdl:10125/20375. OCLC 798846333. Archived from the original (PDF) on 2 January 2020.
- Henige, David P. (1974). The Chronology of Oral Tradition: Quest for a Chimera. Oxford: Clarendon Press. ISBN 978-0-19-821694-0.
- Laval, Honoré; Newbury, C. W.; O'Reilly, Patrick (1968). Mémoires pour servir à l'histoire de Mangareva: ère chrétienne, 1834–1871. Paris: Musée de l'Homme.
- Williamson, Robert W. (2013). The Social and Political Systems of Central Polynesia. Vol. 3. Cambridge: Cambridge University Press. ISBN 978-1-107-62572-3.

Government offices
Preceded by Maria Eutokia Toaputeitou	Regent of Mangareva; 1869	Succeeded by Arone Teikatoara
