= Bernardo Putairi =

Regent of Mangareva (d. 1889)

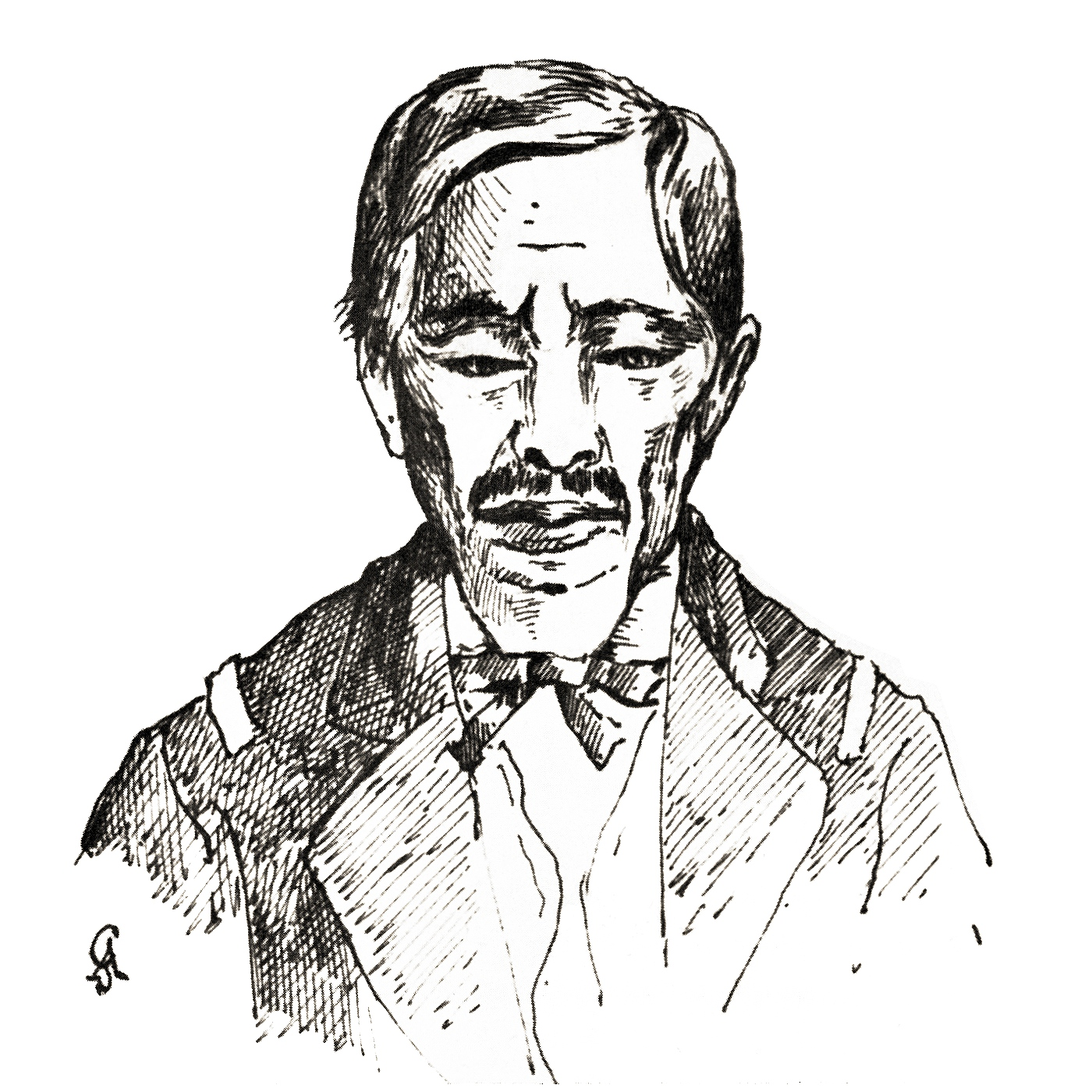

Regent of Mangareva
- Tenure: 1873–1881
- Predecessor: Arone Teikatoara
- Died: 1 January or 7 January 1889
- Spouse: Gertrude Toategaru
- Issue: Dominika; Tiripone Mama Taira Putairi
- Religion: Roman Catholicism

Bernardo Putairi (died 1 January or 7 January 1889) was the Prince Regent of the island of Mangareva, and other Gambier Islands including Akamaru, Aukena, Taravai and Temoe from 1873 to 1881. He served as regent and de facto monarch during the interregnum period when the royal succession of Mangareva was in doubt and after the death of the last royal heir became the last monarch of the island kingdom. His name is often written Putaïri or Putairï in French sources.

== Biography ==
Bernardo Putairi was a member of the royal togoʻiti class of chiefs of the island of Mangareva in the Gambier Islands. He was considered to be from a junior branch of the main royal line. According to French Picpus priest Honoré Laval, he was the descendant of a fallen dynasty. Christianity was introduced to the Gambier Islands in his lifetime by French Picpus priests, Honoré Laval and François Caret with the support of King Maputeoa (of the main line) and his uncle Matua, the high priest. Putairi's first wife was a sister of Queen Maria Eutokia Toaputeitou, the consort of Maputeoa. He had two known children: Dominika, who was regarded as a potential bride of King Joseph Gregorio II, and Tiripone Mama Taira Putairi, the first Eastern Polynesian to be ordained into the Roman Catholic priesthood. Gertrude Toategaru was noted as the mother of Tiripone.

When King Maputeoa died on 20 June 1857, he was succeeded as King of Mangareva by his young son, Joseph Gregorio II, with his widow Queen Maria Eutokia Toaputeitou as regent. King Joseph died childless after an eleven-year reign.

After the untimely death of the king without issue in 1868, the succession of the throne was thrown into doubt. Traditionally only male heirs could ascend to the throne of Mangareva, so a regency was installed pending the birth of an heir from one of the king's two surviving sisters: Agnès and Philomèle.

A series of regents ruled in the name of these two royal sisters. On 27 August 1869, Queen Dowager Maria Eutokia Toaputeitou appointed Arone Teikatoara, as regent and named Bernardo Teoaiti, Agapito, and Bernardo Putairi as his advisers, while entrusting Teoaiti with the management of her household affairs. Teoaiti served as the tutor and guardian of Agnès and Philomèle, the surviving sisters of King Joseph Gregorio II.

In 1873, Arone Teikatoara was forced to resign after kissing a girl in public and was succeeded in his post by Bernardo Putairi. According to Paul Eugene Louis Deschanel, after the death of Agnès and his accession to the regency, the French missionaries under Father Nicolas Blanc, head of the Gambier Island mission, and Bishop Tepano Jaussen, Vicar Apostolic of Tahiti, predicted the regency would pass from Bernardo Putairi to his son Tiripone, who as a priest would bring the archipelago into the domain of the Congregation of the Sacred Hearts of Jesus and Mary. However, Tiripone predeceased his father.

Between 1873 and 1881, the last member of the royal family Philomèle, who had been considered an idiot, blind and a hunchback, died. When French colonial commissioner Henri Isidore Chessé visited the island in 1881, Bernardo Putairi had been named King after the death of Philomèle. After the demise of most of the royal family (togoʻiti), the Gambier Islands steadily fell under colonial influence, it having already been a French protectorate since 1871 under Regent Arone. His rule ended with the island kingdom's annexation by France. On 21 February 1881, the native government and people assembled and Putairi along with eighteen government officials signed a declaration ceding the kingdom's authority to France, which the French commissioner Chessé approved. A revised set of the Mangarevan law codes incorporating French law were promulgated on 23 February, and the treaty of annexation was approved by the President of France on 30 January 1882. Native laws were completely abolished in 1887. The Gambier Islands were incorporated into the territory of French Oceania, today part of the overseas country of French Polynesia. After his deposition, Bernardo Putairi was given a pension by the French colonial government. He died on 1 January or 7 January 1889.

== Bibliography ==
- Cuzent, Gilbert (1872). Voyage aux îles Gambier (Archipel de Mangarèva). Paris: V. Masson et Fils.
- Deschanel, Paul Eugene Louis (1888). Les intérêts français dans l'océan Pacifique. Paris: Berger-Levrault et cie.
- Garrett, John (1982). To Live Among the Stars: Christian Origins in Oceania. Suva, Fiji: Institute of Pacific Studies, University of the South Pacific. ISBN 978-2-8254-0692-2.
- Gonschor, Lorenz Rudolf (August 2008). Law as a Tool of Oppression and Liberation: Institutional Histories and Perspectives on Political Independence in Hawaiʻi, Tahiti Nui/French Polynesia and Rapa Nui (PDF) (MA thesis). Honolulu: University of Hawaii at Manoa. hdl:10125/20375. OCLC 798846333. Archived from the original (PDF) on 2 January 2020.
- Henige, David P. (1974). The Chronology of Oral Tradition: Quest for a Chimera. Oxford: Clarendon Press. ISBN 978-0-19-821694-0.
- Laval, Honoré; Newbury, C. W.; O'Reilly, Patrick (1968). Mémoires pour servir à l'histoire de Mangareva: ère chrétienne, 1834–1871. Paris: Musée de l'Homme.

Government offices
Preceded by Arone Teikatoara	Regent of Mangareva; 1873–1881	French annexation
