= Arone Teikatoara =

Regent of Mangareva (d. 1881)

Regent of Mangareva
- Tenure: 1869–1873
- Predecessor: Akakio Tematereikura
- Successor: Bernardo Putairi
- Died: 30 October 1881
- Issue: Eritapeta
- Religion: Roman Catholicism
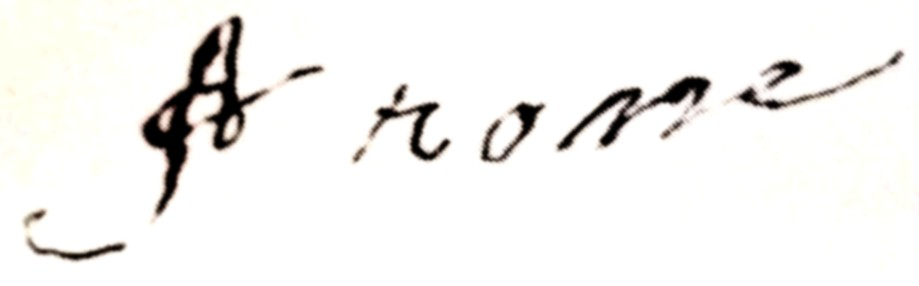
- Signature

Arone Teikatoara (died 30 October 1881) was the penultimate Prince Regent of the island of Mangareva, and other Gambier Islands including Akamaru, Aukena, Taravai and Temoe from 1869 to 1873. He served as regent and de facto monarch during the interregnum period when the royal succession of Mangareva was in doubt. His first name has also been spelled "Arona", "Aarona" or "Aarone".

== Biography ==
Arone Teikatoara was a member of the royal togoʻiti class of chiefs of the island of Mangareva in the Gambier Islands. He was a younger brother or the son of a younger brother of King Maputeoa. He shared the same name with Te Ika-tohora, the father of Maputeoa, who was killed by a shark. Christianity was introduced to the Gambier Islands in the 1830s by French Picpus priests, Honoré Laval and François Caret with the support of King Maputeoa and his uncle Matua, the high priest.

When King Maputeoa died on 20 June 1857, he was succeeded as King of Mangareva by his young son, Joseph Gregorio II, with his widow Queen Maria Eutokia Toaputeitou as regent. Arone's daughter Eritapeta was one of the three bridal candidates for the new king but was ultimately rejected because she was considered too young. In 1868, King Joseph died childless after an eleven-year reign. After the untimely death of the king without issue in 1868, the succession of the throne was thrown into doubt. Traditionally only male heirs could ascend to the throne of Mangareva, so a regency was installed pending the birth of an heir from one of the king's two surviving sisters: Agnès and Philomèle. A series of regents ruled in the name of these two royal sisters. In 1869, he succeeded to the regency after the death of the previous regents Akakio Tematereikura and Queen Maria Eutokia Toaputeitou. Before her death, the dowager queen came out of retirement at Rouru Convent for a day and selected Arone herself because of his familial relation to her two daughters. The chiefs Bernardo Teoaiti, Agapito and Bernardo Putairi were chosen as his assistants.

After the demise of most of the royal family (togoʻiti), the Gambier Islands steadily fell under French colonial influence. Influenced by the missionaries, the native rulers tried to maintain indigenous autonomy. On 4 February 1870, Arone wrote to the French Minister of the Navy to withdraw an earlier request by King Maputeoa for a French protectorate in 1844, which had never been ratified by the French government due to a change in policy. The French attributed the request to the influence of Laval, who was viewed as "isolated from the world for thirty-six years and carried away by exaggerated religious ideas". French officials sought the priest's removal. In order to appease Paris and "still this storm", Bishop Jaussen transferred Laval to Papeete, Tahiti and named him his pro-vicar, later making him Vice Provincial. The removal of Father Laval, the head of the Catholic mission, removed the last obstacle for the French. On 30 November 1871, a treaty signed between French commissioner Hippolyte Auguste Girard and Arone Teikatoara declared Mangareva and its dependencies in the Gambiers as a protectorate of the French Third Republic.

In 1873, Arone Teikatoara was obliged to resign the regency for publicly kissing a woman on the streets. He was succeeded by Bernardo Putairi, the tutor of the two princesses. On 21 February 1881, the island kingdom was formally annexed to France and incorporated into the territory of French Oceania, today part of the overseas country of French Polynesia. The annexation treaty provided a pension for the ruling elites including the former regent Arone Teikatoara, who received 1,200 francs. He died on 30 October 1881.

== Bibliography ==
- Cuzent, Gilbert (1872). Voyage aux îles Gambier (Archipel de Mangarèva). Paris: V. Masson et Fils.
- Deschanel, Paul Eugene Louis (1888). Les intérêts français dans l'océan Pacifique. Paris: Berger-Levrault et cie.
- Garrett, John (1982). To Live Among the Stars: Christian Origins in Oceania. Suva, Fiji: Institute of Pacific Studies, University of the South Pacific. ISBN 978-2-8254-0692-2.
- Gonschor, Lorenz Rudolf (August 2008). Law as a Tool of Oppression and Liberation: Institutional Histories and Perspectives on Political Independence in Hawaiʻi, Tahiti Nui/French Polynesia and Rapa Nui (PDF) (MA thesis). Honolulu: University of Hawaii at Manoa. hdl:10125/20375. OCLC 798846333. Archived from the original (PDF) on 2 January 2020.
- Henige, David P. (1974). The Chronology of Oral Tradition: Quest for a Chimera. Oxford: Clarendon Press. ISBN 978-0-19-821694-0.
- Laval, Honoré; Newbury, C. W.; O'Reilly, Patrick (1968). Mémoires pour servir à l'histoire de Mangareva: ère chrétienne, 1834-1871. Paris: Musée de l'Homme.

Government offices
Preceded by Akakio Tematereikura	Regent of Mangareva; 1869–1873	Succeeded by Bernardo Putairi
