= Urbain de Florit de La Tour de Clamouze =

French nobleman and lay brother

- Born: October 7, 1794; Meyrueis, Lozère, France
- Died: August 2, 1868 (aged 73); Rikitea, Mangareva
- Occupation: Missionary

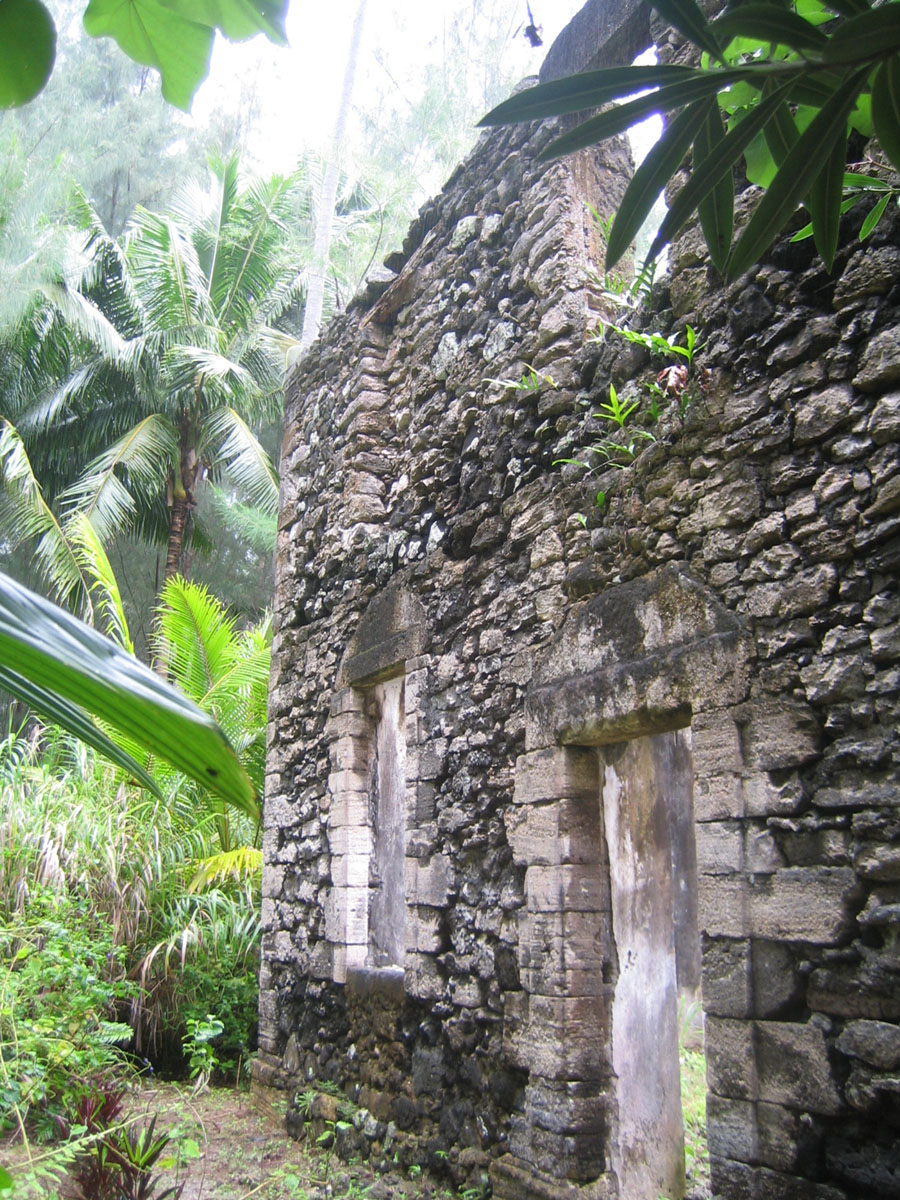
Ruins of the Re'e Seminary College on Aukena, one of the earliest institution of higher learning in French Polynesia, founded by Urbain de Florit de La Tour de Clamouze

Coat of arms of the Florit de La Tour de Clamouze de Corsac family

Urbain de Florit de La Tour de Clamouze, SS.CC., (born Alphonse de Florit de La Tour de Clamouze; 7 October 1794 – 2 August 1868) was a French nobleman and later lay brother of the Congregation of the Sacred Hearts of Jesus and Mary, a religious institute of the Roman Catholic Church. He was part of the Roman Catholic mission in the Gambier Islands from 1835 until his death in 1863. He founded and headed the Re'e Seminary College on Aukena, one of the earliest institution of higher learning in the South Pacific, where native Mangarevan boys were taught Latin and French as future clergymen. The young King Joseph Gregorio II was also educated at the college.

== Bibliography ==
- Garrett, John (1982). To Live Among the Stars: Christian Origins in Oceania. Suva, Fiji: Institute of Pacific Studies, University of the South Pacific. ISBN 978-2-8254-0692-2.
- Laval, Honoré; Newbury, C. W.; O'Reilly, Patrick (1968). Mémoires pour servir à l'histoire de Mangareva: ère chrétienne, 1834-1871. Paris: Musée de l'Homme.
- Kirk, Robert W. (2012). Paradise Past: The Transformation of the South Pacific, 1520-1920. Jefferson, NC: McFarland. ISBN 978-0-7864-6978-9.
- Wiltgen, Ralph M. (2010). The Founding of the Roman Catholic Church in Oceania, 1825 to 1850. Eugene, OR: Wipf and Stock Publishers. ISBN 978-1-60899-536-3.
- Yzendoorn, Reginald (1927). History of the Catholic Mission in the Hawaiian Islands. Honolulu: Honolulu Star-Bulletin.
