= Maria Eutokia Toaputeitou =

Queen Regent of Mangareva
- Tenure: 1857–1868; 1868–1869
- Successor: Akakio Tematereikura
- Died: 27 August 1869
- Spouse: Maputeoa
- Issue: Joseph Gregorio II; Jean Népomucène; Agnès Tepairu; Philomèle; Catherine
- Religion: Roman Catholicism
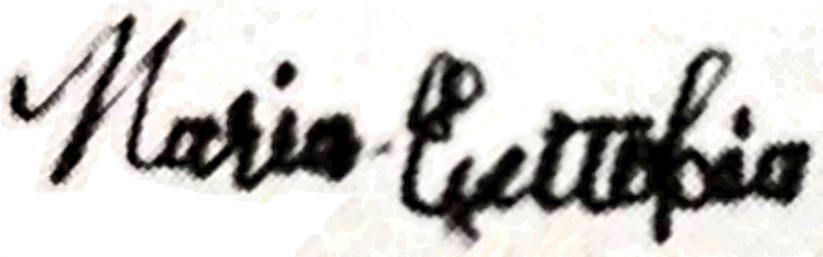
- Signature

Maria Eutokia Toaputeitou (French: Marie Eudoxie; died 27 August 1869) was Queen consort of the island of Mangareva, and other Gambier Islands including Akamaru, Aukena, Taravai and Temoe. She served as regent for her son in his minority in 1857–1868, and for a short period afterward in the interregnum period of 1868–1869, when the royal succession of Mangareva was in doubt.

== Biography ==
Maria Eutokia was the second wife of King Gregorio I Maputeoa. Christianity was introduced to the Gambier Islands in her lifetime by French Picpus priests, Honoré Laval and François Caret with the support of her husband Maputeoa and his uncle Matua, the high priest. She was baptized with the name Maria Eutokia after her conversion to the new faith. Maria Eutokia and Maputeoa had five children, two sons and three daughters, which survived infancy. The royal couple's five children include the eldest surviving son Joseph Gregorio II, a second son named Jean Népomucène after Saint John of Nepomuk, and three daughters: Agnès Tepairu, Philomèle, and Catherine, two of these girls became nuns in the Rouru Convent on Mount Duff.

=== Regency ===
In 1857, Maputeoa died and Joseph Gregorio became king at the age of ten. Because of his minority, Queen Maria Eutokia assumed the regency for the young monarch. Considered a sickly child, Joseph Gregorio died on 21 November 1868 without leaving issue. Because the throne of Mangareva could only pass to a male heir, another regency was installed with Maria Eutokia at the head pending the birth of a male heir from one of Maputeoa and Maria Eutokia's two surviving daughters. At the time, other factions in the kingdom were in support of ending the monarchy and either becoming a Republic or a theocracy under the guidance of Father Honoré Laval and the French mission. Queen Maria Eutokia relied on the advice and counsel of Father Laval just as over a decade earlier, Queen Pōmare IV of Tahiti looked to British consul and missionary George Pritchard.

=== Later life ===
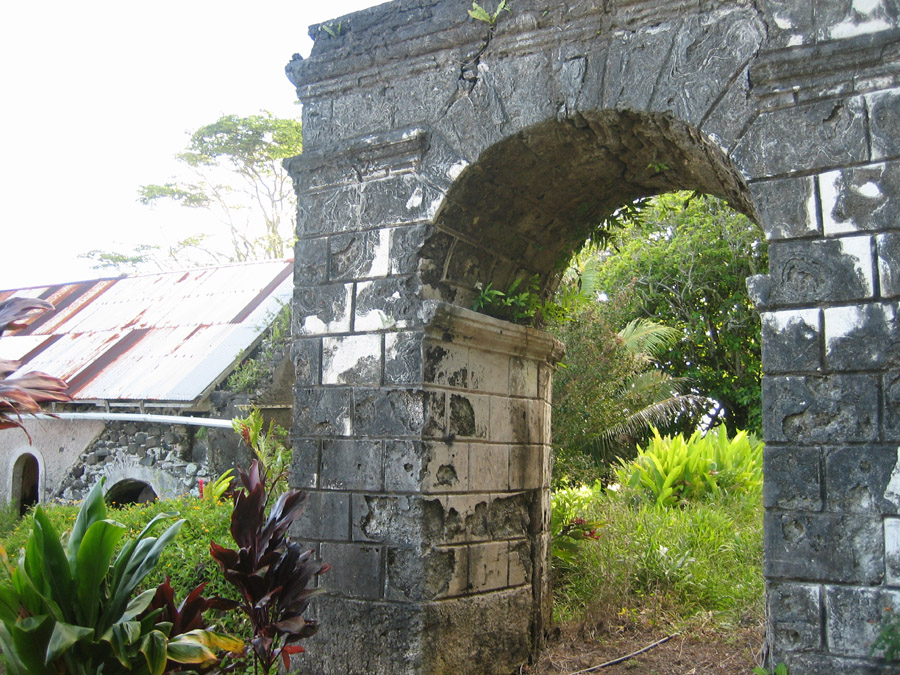
The ruins of Rouru Convent, where Queen Maria Eutokia retired to in later life as a novice

After serving as Queen Regent for another year, Maria Eutokia retired and entered the Rouru Convent on Mount Duff becoming a novice in her later life. Akakio Tematereikura, a cousin of Maputeoa's and son of his uncle Matua, succeeded as regent. However, because Akakio predeceased Maria Eutokia by three days, she was responsible for choosing the next regent for Mangareva. She considered choosing Father Laval as the new regent and turu (guardian) of her two surviving daughter Agnès and Philomèle but Laval refused the offer. Instead, Aarona, a paternal uncle of her children, was chosen to succeed as regent and another chief Bernardo Teoaiti became the guardian and tutor of the two girls. Maria Eutokia died shortly afterward on 27 August 1869. Her eldest daughter Agnès died in November 1873 and Philomèle, considered an idiot, blind and a hunchback, died before 1881. After the demise of most of the royal family (togoʻiti), the Gambier Islands steadily fell under colonial influence, becoming a French protectorate in 1871 and fully annexed to the territory of French Oceania in 1881, today part of the overseas country of French Polynesia.

== Bibliography ==
- Cuzent, Gilbert (1872). Voyage aux îles Gambier (Archipel de Mangarèva). Paris: V. Masson et Fils.
- Deschanel, Paul Eugene Louis (1888). Les intérêts français dans l'océan Pacifique. Paris: Berger-Levrault et cie.
- Eskridge, Robert Lee (1931). Manga Reva: the Forgotten Islands. Indianapolis: The Bobbs-Merrill company.
- Garrett, John (1982). To Live Among the Stars: Christian Origins in Oceania. Suva, Fiji: Institute of Pacific Studies, University of the South Pacific. ISBN 978-2-8254-0692-2.
- Henige, David P. (1974). The Chronology of Oral Tradition: Quest for a Chimera. Oxford: Clarendon Press. ISBN 978-0-19-821694-0.
- Laval, Honoré; Newbury, C. W.; O'Reilly, Patrick (1968). Mémoires pour servir à l'histoire de Mangareva: ère chrétienne, 1834–1871. Paris: Musée de l'Homme.
- Lesson, A. (1846). "Océanie. Archipel de Mangareva (Iles Gambier)". Revue de l'Orient, de l'Algërie et des colonies. Paris. pp. 161–199.
- Stanley, David (1999). South Pacific Handbook. David Stanley. ISBN 978-1-56691-172-6.

Government offices
Preceded by Joseph Gregorio II as King of Mangareva	Regent of Mangareva; 1868–1869	Succeeded by Akakio Tematereikura
