= Fabien Costes =

French Catholic Catechist brother

- Born: 1796; Ceyrac, Aveyron, France
- Died: 6 May 1878 (aged 81–82); Rikitea, Mangareva
- Occupation: Missionary

Fabien Costes, SS.CC., (born Joseph Costes; 1796 – 6 May 1878) was a French Catholic Catechist brother of the Congregation of the Sacred Hearts of Jesus and Mary, a religious institute of the Roman Catholic Church. He was part of the Roman Catholic mission in the Gambier Islands from 1835 until his death in 1878 and with Brother Gilbert Soulié trained the natives workers and masons in the construction of many of the island's impressive buildings including St. Michael's Cathedral in Rikitea.

== Bibliography ==
- Garrett, John (1982). To Live Among the Stars: Christian Origins in Oceania. Suva, Fiji: Institute of Pacific Studies, University of the South Pacific. ISBN 978-2-8254-0692-2.
- Laval, Honoré; Newbury, C. W.; O'Reilly, Patrick (1968). Mémoires pour servir à l'histoire de Mangareva: ère chrétienne, 1834-1871. Paris: Musée de l'Homme.
- Kirk, Robert W. (2012). Paradise Past: The Transformation of the South Pacific, 1520-1920. Jefferson, NC: McFarland. ISBN 978-0-7864-6978-9.
- Wiltgen, Ralph M. (2010). The Founding of the Roman Catholic Church in Oceania, 1825 to 1850. Eugene, OR: Wipf and Stock Publishers. ISBN 978-1-60899-536-3.
- Yzendoorn, Reginald (1927). History of the Catholic Mission in the Hawaiian Islands. Honolulu: Honolulu Star-Bulletin.
