= Joseph Gregorio II =

King of Mangareva
- Reign: 20 June 1857 – 21 November 1868
- Predecessor: Maputeoa
- Born: 26 April 1847
- Died: 21 November 1868 (aged 21); Aukena
- Burial: Mausolée du Roi Maputeoa, Chapelle St-Pierre
- Spouse: Agapa
- Father: Maputeoa
- Mother: Maria Eutokia Toaputeitou
- Religion: Roman Catholicism

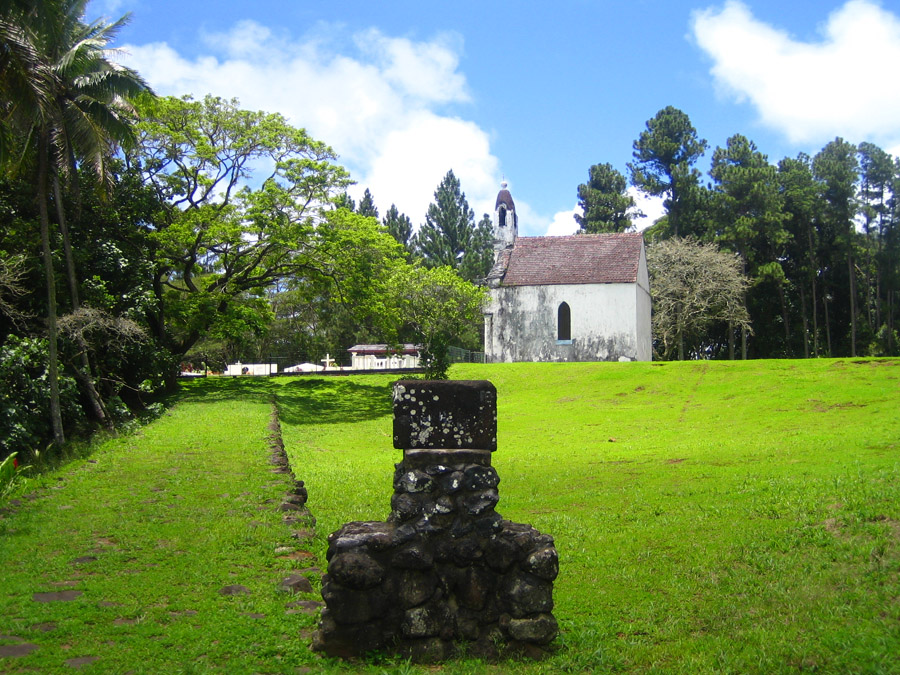
Chapelle St-Pierre, Rikitea, where King Joseph Gregorio and his father Maputeoa are buried.

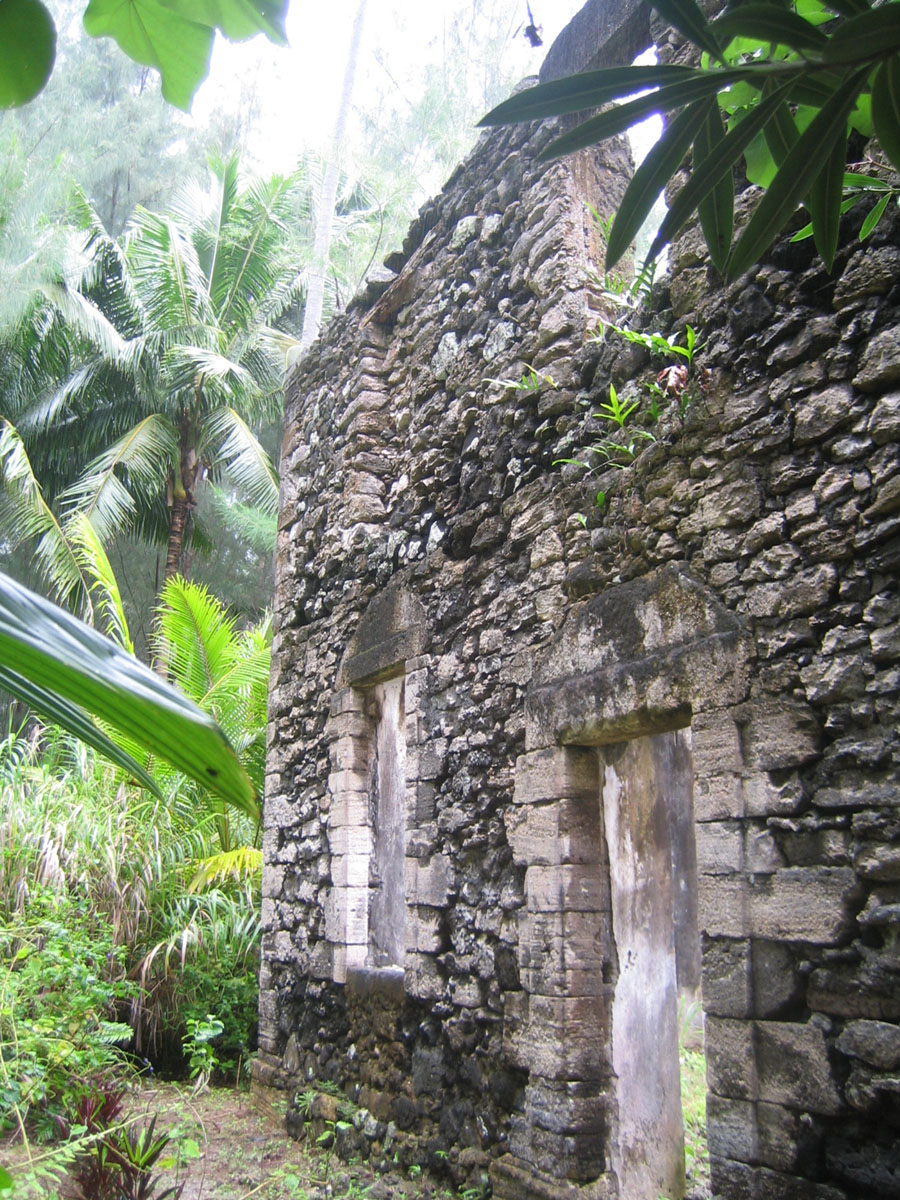
Ruins of the Re'e Seminary College on Aukena, one of the earliest institution of higher learning in French Polynesia, where Joseph Gregorio II received his education

Joseph Gregorio II (French: Joseph Grégoire II; born 26 April 1847 – 21 November 1868) was the last King or ʻAkariki (paramount chief) of the island of Mangareva, and other Gambier Islands including Akamaru, Aukena, Taravai and Temoe. His short reign lasted from 1857 until his death in 1868. His childless death left the royal succession of Mangareva in doubt.

== Biography ==
Born 26 April 1847, he was the eldest surviving son of King Gregorio I Maputeoa and Queen Maria Eutokia Toaputeitou, one of his two wives. Joseph had four siblings: one brother named Jean Népomucène and three sisters, two of whom became nuns in the Rouru Convent on Mount Duff. Prior to his birth, his father and his great uncle Matua played pivotal roles in the conversion of the Gambier Islands to Christianity by French Picpus priests, Honoré Laval and François Caret.

At the age of ten, Joseph became king upon Maputeoa's death. His mother Queen Maria Eutokia Toaputeitou assumed the regency, although the French missionary Father Honoré Laval had extensive control over the royal mother and son and was considered the true power behind the throne. During most of his reign, the young king was educated by the French missionaries at the Re'e Seminary College on Aukena, one of the earliest institution of higher learning in the South Pacific. He visited Mangareva only during short intervals and exercised little to no sovereign power while he was on the throne. Because of his poor health, it was deemed necessary for the king to marry and sire an heir to the throne. Three candidates were considered qualified royal brides: Eritapeta, the daughter of Aarona Temateireikura who was too young; Dominika, the daughter of Bernardo Putairi, of a former ruling dynasty and Agapa, the daughter of Akakio Tematereikura. Queen Regent Maria Eutokia's preferred Agapa and in the end, he married Agapa. Agapa's grandfather was Maputeoa's uncle Maria Tepano Matua making them second cousins. Queen Agapa predeceased her husband on 7 June 1868.

Joseph Gregorio died without leaving issue on 21 November 1868 while still at school on the island of Aukena. Because the throne of Mangareva could only pass to a male heir, after his death, a regency was installed pending the birth of an heir from one of his two surviving sisters Agnès and Philomèle. At the time, other factions in the kingdom were in support of ending the monarchy and either becoming a republic or a theocracy under the guidance of Laval and the French mission. After his death, the Gambier Islands steadily fell under colonial influence, becoming a French protectorate in 1871 and fully annexed to the territory of French Oceania in 1881, today part of the overseas country of French Polynesia. He is buried alongside his father at the Chapelle St-Pierre located behind St. Michael's Cathedral in Rikitea.

== Bibliography ==
- Cuzent, Gilbert (1872). Voyage aux îles Gambier (Archipel de Mangarèva). Paris: V. Masson et Fils.
- Deschanel, Paul Eugene Louis (1888). Les intérêts français dans l'océan Pacifique. Paris: Berger-Levrault et cie.
- Eskridge, Robert Lee (1931). Manga Reva: the Forgotten Islands. Indianapolis: The Bobbs-Merrill company.
- Garrett, John (1982). To Live Among the Stars: Christian Origins in Oceania. Suva, Fiji: Institute of Pacific Studies, University of the South Pacific. ISBN 978-2-8254-0692-2.
- Henige, David P. (1974). The Chronology of Oral Tradition: Quest for a Chimera. Oxford: Clarendon Press. ISBN 978-0-19-821694-0.
- Laval, Honoré; Newbury, C. W.; O'Reilly, Patrick (1968). Mémoires pour servir à l'histoire de Mangareva: ère chrétienne, 1834-1871. Paris: Musée de l'Homme.
- Smith, S. Percy (1918). "Notes on the Mangareva, or Gambier group of islands, eastern Polynesia". Journal of the Polynesian Society. 27. Wellington, NZ: Polynesian Society: 115–131. Archived from the original on 2018-07-23.
- Williamson, Robert W. (2013). The Social and Political Systems of Central Polynesia. Vol. 3. Cambridge: Cambridge University Press. ISBN 978-1-107-62572-3.

Regnal titles
Preceded by Maputeoa	King of Mangareva; 1857–1868	Succeeded by Maria Eutokia Toaputeitou as Regent
