= List of monarchs of Mangareva =

Flag of the Kingdom of Mangareva

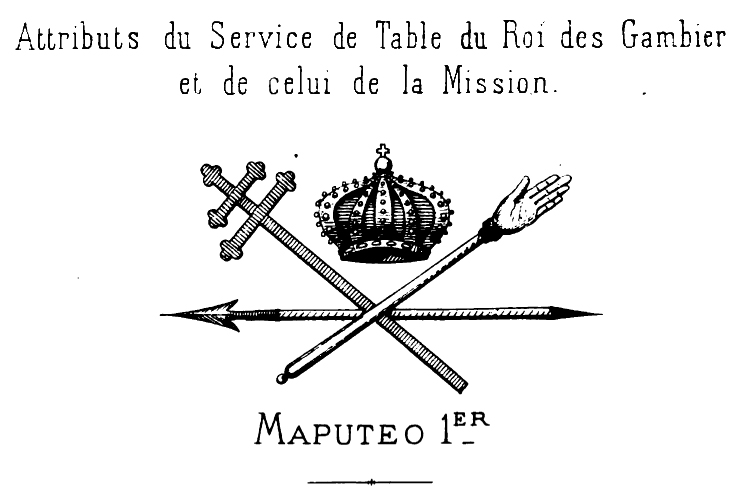
Attributs du Service de Table du Roi des Gambier et de celui de la Mission

The island of Mangareva, in the Gambier Islands of Polynesia, was a monarchy until its annexation by France on 21 February 1881. Although there were other monarchs of the Gambier Islands like Taravai, the kings of Mangareva were considered of the highest ranking. The islands kings and chiefs were called ʻakariki from the togoʻiti class.

== Lists of the monarchs of Mangareva ==
Like many Polynesian genealogies, that of Mangareva commences with the gods, or, perhaps, deified ancestors.

1. Atu-motua
2. Atu-moana
3. Tangaroa-mea
4. Tangaroa-hurupapa
5. Tu-te-kekeu
6. Oroki
7. Vaiamo
8. Not given
9. Not given
10. Turu-kura
11. Turu-rei
12. Taivere and Taroi, sons of Ua, who came from Rarotonga with her brother Te Tupua, and married Nono of Mangareva. It is said that it was in their reign, Tupa [q.v] arrived bringing the coco-nut.
13. Not given
14. Taki-marama
15. Toronga
16. Popi, or Popi-te-moa
17. Angi-a-Popi
18. Tipoti, son of Angi-a-Popi and Te Puru-on u
19. Tahau-mangi
20. Pono-te-akariki, son of Makoha-iti and Raui-roro, nephew of Tahaumangi
21. Not given
22. Tama-keu. His son Etua-taorea, had a daughter, Toa-te-Etua-taorea, an unfortunate queen whose throat was pierced to introduce water she had demanded to quench her thirst. Her body, and that of her child, were eaten after her death.
23. Reitapu, of Rikitea, son of Tae-Tamakeu and Tuareu; his death at Raramei-tau (at Kirimiro), where he was assassinated, occasioning the loss of Taku.
24. Mahanga-vihinui, father of Ape-iti.
25. Ape-iti, of Rikitea, the conqueror of Taku. Under him the great migration that peopled Reao, Pukaruha, Takoto, Vahitahi, Hao, Fakahina, Fangatu, and partly Hikueru by supplying women, took place—these are Tuamotu Islands.
26. Meihara-tuharua
27. Pokau
28. Okeu
29. Makoro-tau-eriki—in whose time there was peace, no wars.
30. Mangi-tu-tavake, son of Makoro-tau-arike and his wife Makutea.
31. Te Ariki-tea, son of Mangi-tu-tavake; reigned only in name. His brother Te Ariki-pongo was preferred by the people.
32. Te Oa, son of Te Ariki-tea and Toatau.
33. Te Mateoa (or Mapu-rure). His wife was Purure. Died circa 1830 or 1832.
34. Te Ika-tohora. Died circa 1824.
35. Te Maputeoa, Gregorio I, r. 1830–1857. Died 20 June 1857.
36. Joseph Gregorio II, r. 1857–1868. Died 21 November 1868.

== Regents ==
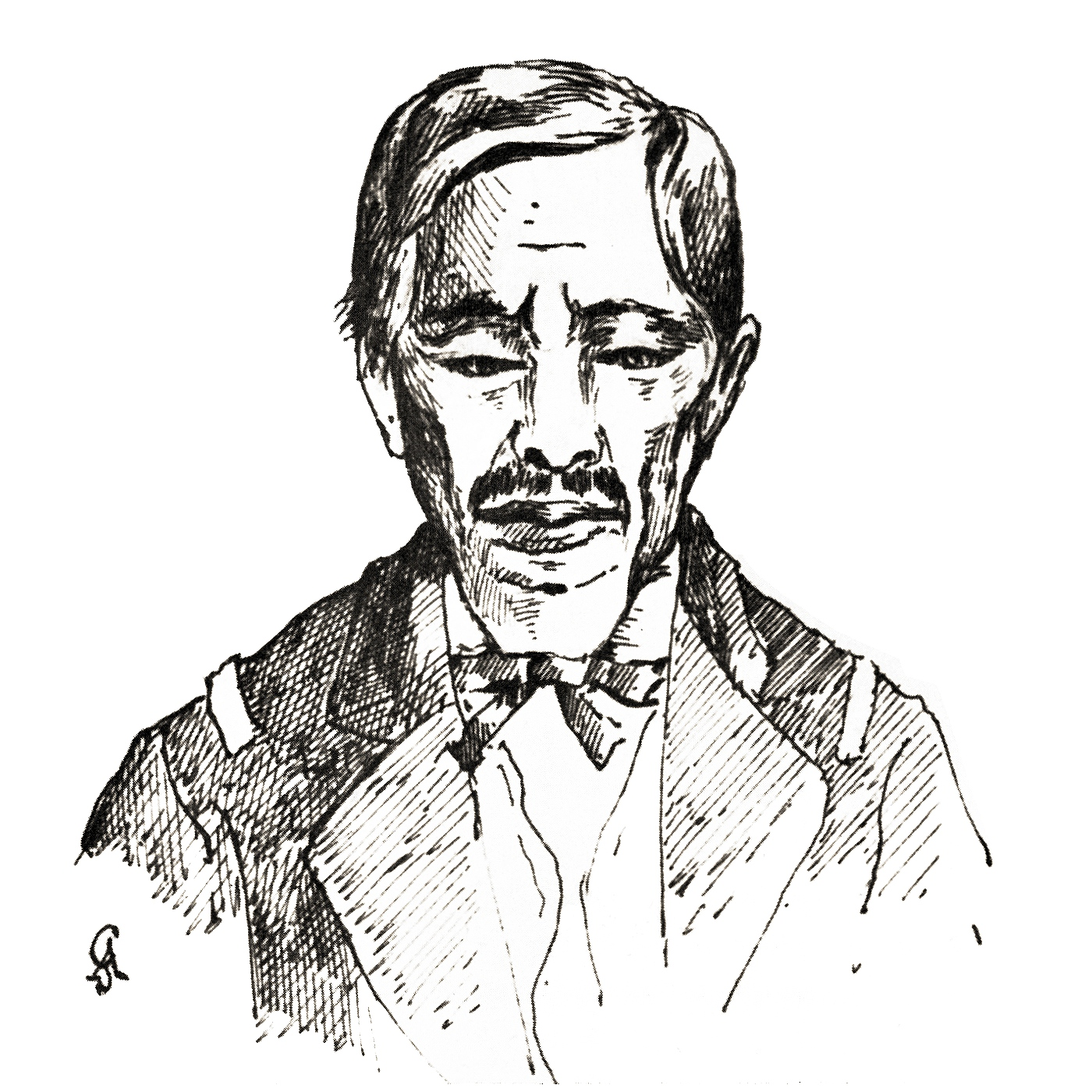
Bernardo Putairi, Prince Regent of Mangareva

Because of King Joseph Gregorio II's minority, he ruled alongside his mother Queen Maria Eutokia Toaputeitou and uncle Elia Teoa. In 1868, Joseph Gregorio II died without issue and a regency was installed pending the birth a male heir to Agnès or Philomèle, the two surviving daughters of Maputeoa.

- Elia Teoa, regent c. 1857, after the death of Maputeoa with Maria Eutokia for his nephew Joseph Gregorio II.
- Maria Eutokia Toaputeitou, regent 1857–1868 with her son; then 1868–1869 alone. Retired to Rouru Convent and died 27 August 1869.
- Akakio Tematereikura, regent 1869. Died 24 August 1869.
- Arone Teikatoara, regent 1869–1873. Forced to resign after kissing a girl in the street and died 30 October 1881.
- Bernardo Putairi, regent 1873–1881. Died 1 January 1889.

- By 1881, when Henri Isidore Chessé visited the island, Bernardo Putairi had been named King after Philomèle's death.

== Family tree ==
Below is the genealogy of the royal line of Mangareva.

Immigrants and heroes
Apeiti
Eight generations
Te Oa (m)	Purure (f)
Matapoto (f)	Te Mateoa (m) (?–1830)	Terehi-kura (f)	Toa-teoa (f)	Teiti-a-purepure (m)	Toa-pakia (f)
Te Ma-terehikura (m)	Te Rouru (m)	Te Ahu-o-rogo (m)	Toa-terehikura (f)	Purure (f)	Matua (m)	Toa-Matui (f)
Te Ika-Tohara (m)	Puteoa (f)	Toa-Mateoa (f)	Toa-teoaiti (f)	Toa-maevahake (f)
Bernardo Putairi* (?–1889)	Te Maputeoa (1814–1857)	Maria Eutokia (?–1869)	Arone Teikatoara** (?–1881)	Elia Teoa**	Akakio; Tematereikura (?–1869)	Agnès; Toamani
Joseph; Gregorio II (1847–1868)	Jean; Népomucène	Philomèle	Catherine	Agnès Tepairu or Teiti-a-Gregorio (?–1873)	Maria Tepano; Teikatoara	Agapa (?–1868)

*Bernardo Putairi was unrelated to the royal line. He was the guardian and tutor of the two daughters of Maputeoa.
**Arone and Elia were considered brothers of Maputeoa, although it is not known if they were full-brothers or half-brothers.

== Bibliography ==
- Buck, Peter Henry (1938). Ethnology of Mangareva. Bernice P. Bishop Museum Bulletin. Vol. 157. Honolulu: Bernice P. Bishop Museum Press.
- Cuzent, Gilbert (1872). Voyage aux îles Gambier (Archipel de Mangarèva). Paris: V. Masson et Fils.
- Deschanel, Paul Eugene Louis (1888). Les intérêts français dans l'océan Pacifique. Paris: Berger-Levrault et cie.
- Gonschor, Lorenz Rudolf (August 2008). Law as a Tool of Oppression and Liberation: Institutional Histories and Perspectives on Political Independence in Hawaiʻi, Tahiti Nui/French Polynesia and Rapa Nui (PDF) (MA thesis). Honolulu: University of Hawaii at Manoa. hdl:10125/20375. OCLC 798846333.
- Laval, Honoré; Newbury, C. W.; O'Reilly, Patrick (1968). Mémoires pour servir à l'histoire de Mangareva: ère chrétienne, 1834-1871. Paris: Musée de l'Homme.
- Rabou, Albert (1882). "La France En Océanie". La Nouvelle Revue Quatrieme Annee. Paris. pp. 799–807.
- Smith, S. Percy (1918). "Notes on the Mangareva, or Gambier group of islands, eastern Polynesia". Journal of the Polynesian Society. 27. Wellington, NZ: Polynesian Society: 115–131.
- Williamson, Robert W. (2013). The Social and Political Systems of Central Polynesia. Vol. 3. Cambridge: Cambridge University Press. ISBN 978-1-107-62572-3.
