= Gilbert Soulié =

French Catholic missionary

- Born: 1800; Veyrac, Lot, France
- Died: 13 June 1863 (aged 62–63); Rikitea, Mangareva
- Occupation: Missionary

Gilbert Soulié, SS.CC., (born Antoine Soulié; 1800 – 13 June 1863) was a French Catholic Catechist brother of the Congregation of the Sacred Hearts of Jesus and Mary, a religious institute of the Roman Catholic Church. He was part of the Roman Catholic mission in the Gambier Islands from 1835 until his death in 1863 and with Brother Fabien Costes trained the natives workers and masons in the construction of many of the island's impressive buildings including St. Michael's Cathedral in Rikitea.

== Bibliography ==
- Delbos, Jean-Paul; Soulié, Gilbert (1989). Mon clocher de Mangaréva: Gilbert Soulié, SS.CC., frère bâtisseur en Océanie, 1800-1835-1863. Papeete: J.-P. Delbos.
- Delbos, Jean-Paul; Soulié, Gilbert (2002). La mission du bout du monde: la fantastique aventure des bâtisseurs de cathédrales dans l'archipel des Gambier. Moorea: Editions de Tahiti. ISBN 978-2-907776-20-2.
- Garrett, John (1982). To Live Among the Stars: Christian Origins in Oceania. Suva, Fiji: Institute of Pacific Studies, University of the South Pacific. ISBN 978-2-8254-0692-2.
- Laval, Honoré; Newbury, C. W.; O'Reilly, Patrick (1968). Mémoires pour servir à l'histoire de Mangareva: ère chrétienne, 1834-1871. Paris: Musée de l'Homme.
- Kirk, Robert W. (2012). Paradise Past: The Transformation of the South Pacific, 1520-1920. Jefferson, NC: McFarland. ISBN 978-0-7864-6978-9.
- Wiltgen, Ralph M. (2010). The Founding of the Roman Catholic Church in Oceania, 1825 to 1850. Eugene, OR: Wipf and Stock Publishers. ISBN 978-1-60899-536-3.
- Yzendoorn, Reginald (1927). History of the Catholic Mission in the Hawaiian Islands. Honolulu: Honolulu Star-Bulletin.
