= King Joseph =

King Joseph may refer to:

- Joseph Bonaparte, King of Naples between 1806 and 1808, and subsequently King of Spain till 1813 and titular Emperor of the French in the Bonapartist line
- Joseph (Khazar), King of the Khazars in the 950s and 960s
- Joseph I of Portugal, King of Portugal between 1750 and 1777
- Joseph Gregorio II, King of Mangareva between 1857 and 1868
- Joseph I, Holy Roman Emperor, also King of Bohemia, Hungary and Croatia between 1705 and 1711
- Joseph II, also King of Bohemia, Hungary and Croatia between 1780 and 1790
- Franz Joseph I of Austria, also King of Bohemia, Hungary and Croatia between 1848 and 1916
