= Tairi =

In the mythology of Mangareva (French Polynesia), Tairi (Ta'iri) is the god of thunder.
