= Portland Reef =

Submerged shoal in the Gambier Islands in French Polynesia

Coordinates: 23°41′S 134°19′W

Location of Portland Reef in the Pacific Ocean

The Portland Reef (French: Banc Portland) is a submerged shoal not rising above the surface in the Gambier Islands in French Polynesia. It is located in the far southeast of the Tuamotu group archipelago, about 68 km southeast from the Gambier Islands, and 30 km SSE from Temoe Atoll, below the Tropic of Capricorn.

The Portland Reef is made up of a submarine atoll structure lying at a depth of about 10 m.
