= Mangarevan narrative =

Religious mythology in Polynesia

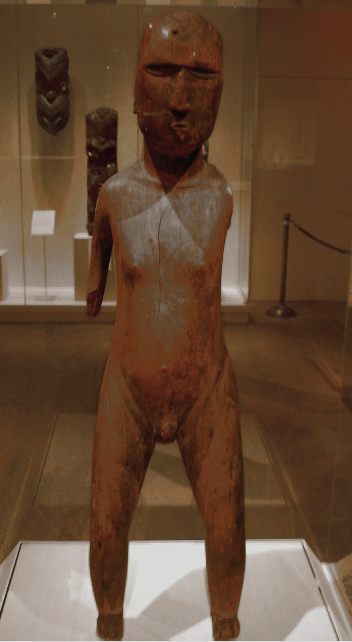
A wooden carving of Mangarevan deity, Metropolitan Museum of Art

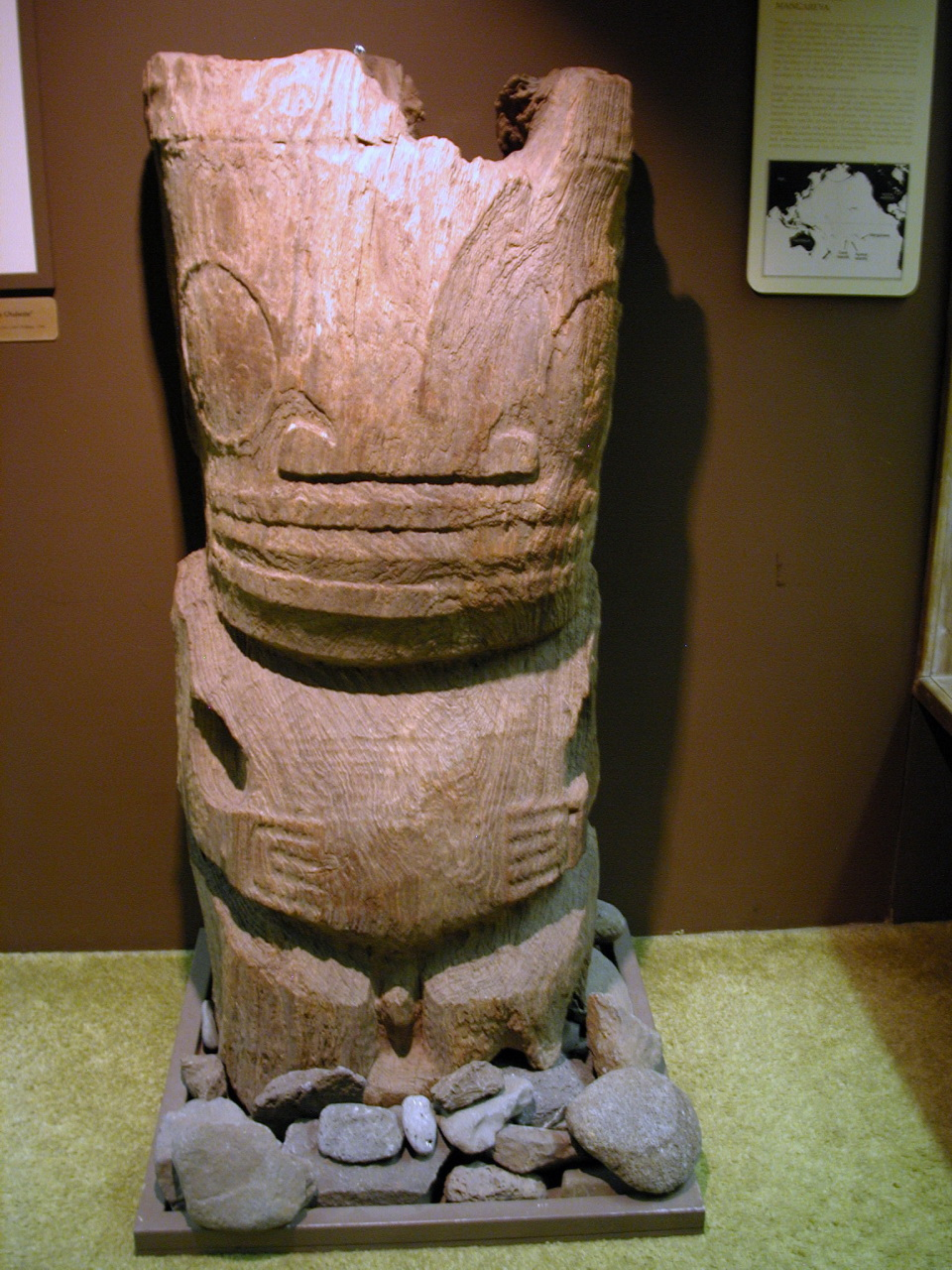
Another Mangareva deity sculpture, Bernice P. Bishop Museum

Mangarevan narrative (or Mangarevan mythology) comprises the legends, historical tales, and sayings of the ancient Mangarevan people. It is considered a variant of a more general Polynesian narrative, developing its own unique character for several centuries before the 1830s. The religion was officially suppressed in the 19th century, and ultimately abandoned by the natives in favor of Roman Catholicism. The Mangarevan term for god was Etua.

== Prominent figures and terms in Mangarevan narrative ==
- Tu, principal god
  - Atu-motua
  - Atu-moana
  - Atea-Tangaroa
- Maui, among the principal gods
- Tagaroa, among the principal gods
- Tangaroa-Hurupapa, probably synonymous with Tagaroa
- Oro, among the principal gods
- Tairi
- Mamaru
- Ari
- Rogo, rain deity
- Toa-miru, goddess of childbirth
- Hina, a savage goddess
- Raka, god of the winds
- Huruamanu and Paparigakura mentioned as kindly gods living at Hapai
- Rao and Tupo were gods of turmeric
- Toa-hakanorenore, goddess incarnate in an eel
- Toa-huehuekaha, goddess appearing in soiled clothing
- Rekareka, god of pleasure
- Ru-te-ragi, god of the stars
- Makuputu, the god of the souls of deceased mortals
- Haumea, consort of Tagaroa
- Tiki, The first man
- Mauike, fire goddess
- Poaru, the underworld
- Po-porutu and pouaru, the heaven of happiness
- Po-garepurepu and po-kine, the heaven of darkness, of fear and dread

== See also ==
- Polynesian narrative
- Ghosts in Polynesian culture
