= Maputeoa =

Monarch of Mangareva and the other Gambier Islands

Te Maputeoa Gregorio I
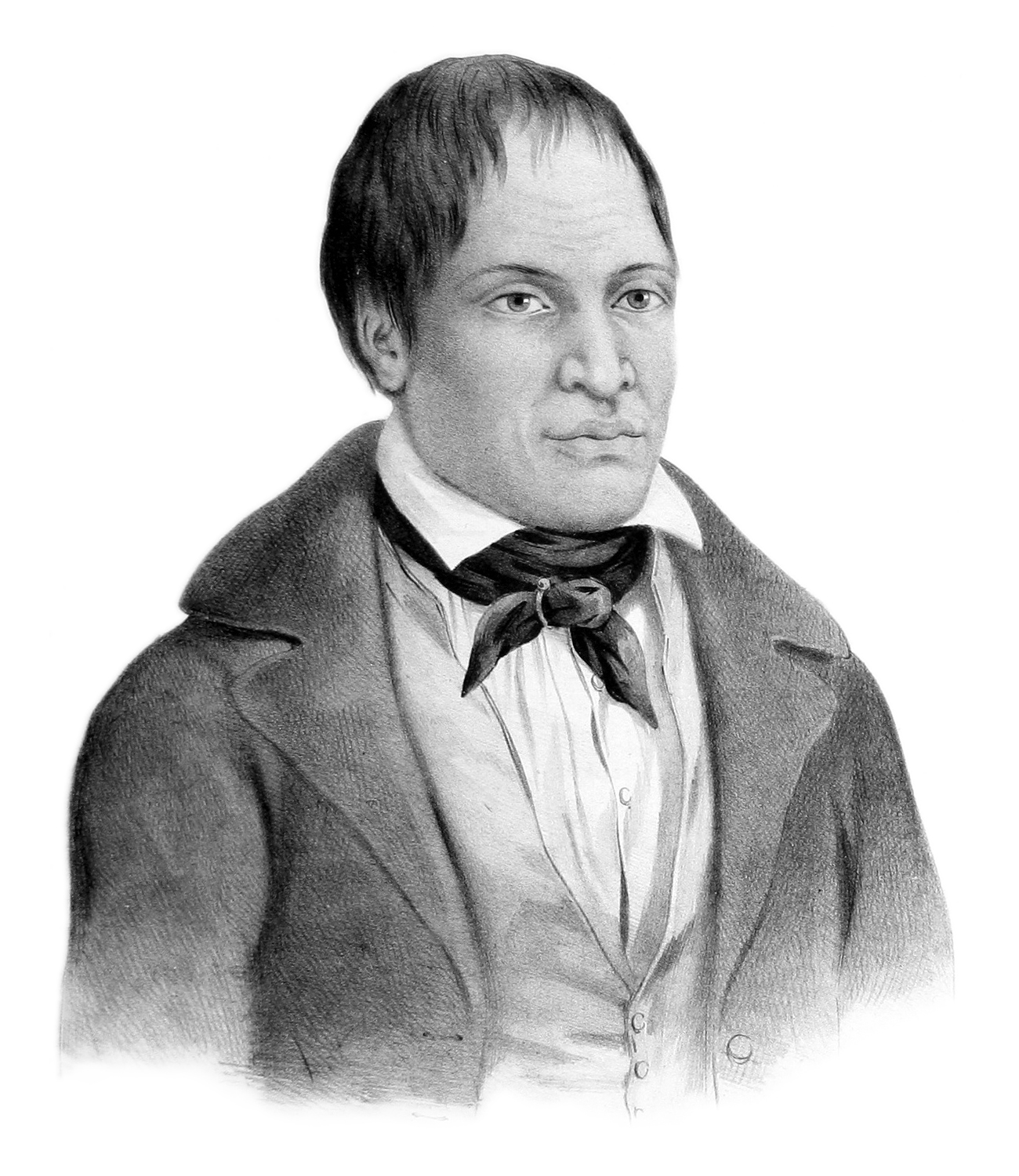
- Drawing of Mapou-Teoa by Jacques Marescot du Thilleul, 1838.

King of Mangareva
- Reign: c. 1830 – 20 June 1857
- Predecessor: Te Mateoa
- Successor: Joseph Gregorio II
- Born: c. 1814; Te Kehika marae, Rikitea, Mangareva
- Died: 20 June 1857; Rikitea, Mangareva
- Burial: 23 June 1857; Mausolée du Roi Maputeoa, Chapelle St-Pierre
- Spouse: Maria Eutokia Toaputeitou, and an earlier wife
- Issue: Joseph Gregorio II; Jean Népomucène; Agnès Tepairu; Philomèle; Catherine
Names
- Gregorio Stanislas Maputeoa; Kerekorio Tanirae Maputeoa
- Father: Te Ikatohara
- Mother: Puteoa
- Religion: Mangarevan; Roman Catholicism
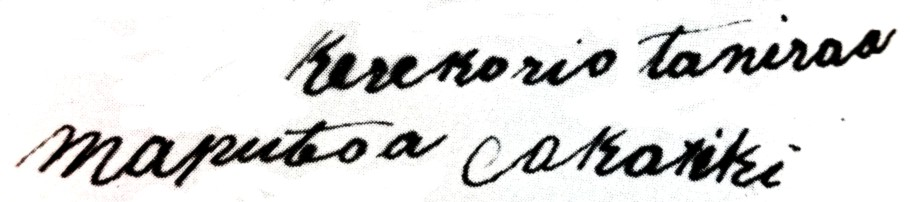
- Signature

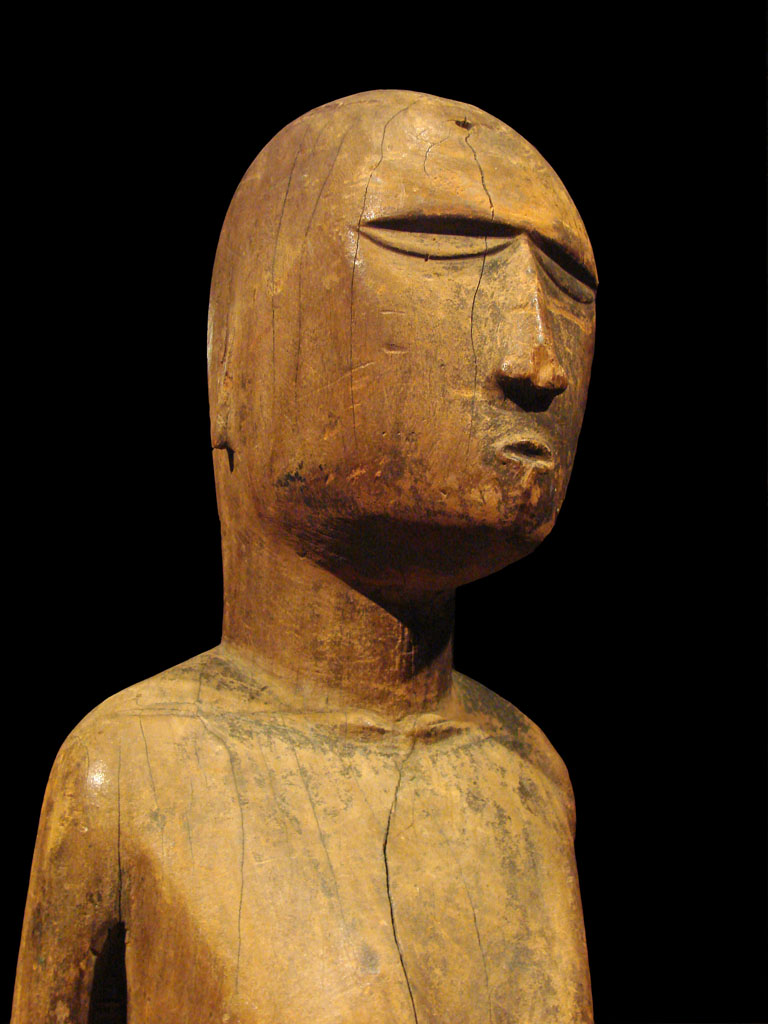
One of the only surviving figures of an ancient Mangarevan god that escaped Maputeoa's destruction.

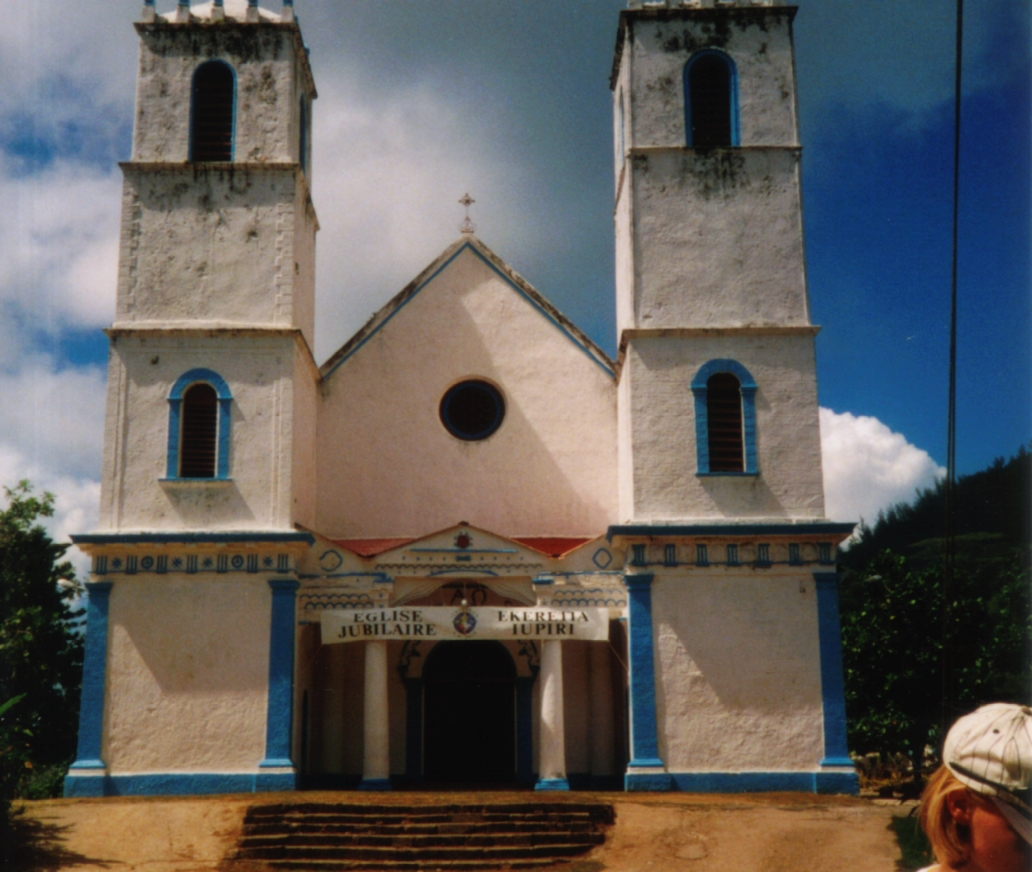
St. Michael's Cathedral, Rikitea

Te Maputeoa (baptized Gregorio Stanislas; reigned as Gregorio I; born c. 1814 – 20 June 1857) was a monarch of the Polynesian island of Mangareva and the other Gambier Islands. He was the King or ʻAkariki (paramount chief), as well as the penultimate king of the island of Mangareva, and other Gambier Islands including Akamaru, Aukena, Taravai and Temoe. He reigned from 1830 until his death in 1857.

During Maputeoa's reign, the country, which was deeply rooted in native beliefs and even cannibalism, became a Roman Catholic community. This was accomplished by removing all vestiges of native beliefs, such as destroying the traditional wooden images of their indigenous faith deified in maraes and replacing them with churches. The king was baptized into Catholicism on 25 August 1836. He learned about Christianity from the island's missionaries, headed by the French Picpus priests, Honoré Laval and François Caret. His uncle Matua, the High Priest of the local temple, also played a pivotal role in this activity.

== Biography ==
Maputeoa was the grandson of Mapurure (also known as Te Mateoa), who was known to be alive in 1825 and said to have died in 1830 or 1832. As Mapurure's son Te Ikatohara was killed by sharks in about 1824, Maputeoa, the grandson, became king after Mapurure's death. Because he was a minor, Maputeoa's uncle, Matua, the High Priest (taura tupua), became the regent; Matua enjoyed the full trust of his people and may have had intentions of usurping power. Maputeoa had complete authority over the kingdom, excepting his four uncles, who jointly owned the land with the king; the uncles' allegiance to the king was only formal. Mangareva also had nominal control over the other Gambier Islands including Akamaru, Aukena, and Taravai, which had their own kings who were vassals to the monarch at Rikitea.

Christian missionaries headed by Father Honoré Laval and Father François Caret from Chile of the order of the Congregation of the Sacred Hearts of Jesus and Mary, landed in August 1834, at Mangareva, which was then an independent kingdom under King Maputeoa. The king refused them access to the main island of Mangareva. However, the missionaries managed to land on a small island where the local chief gave them support to learn the Mangareva language and the islanders learned about Christianity. Within one of year of their arrival, the missionaries converted the islanders at Taravai, Aukena and Akamuru to Christianity, established churches, and even convinced the islanders to wear tunics.

Initially, Matua accepted the Catholic religious practices. He donated the maraes to the missionaries to build churches and advised them on how to overthrow the king. As Maputeoa recognized what Matua was trying to do, the king began appearing in churches during mass. Two years after the missionaries' arrival in Gambier, Maputeoa consented to dismantle the Te Keika marae, which was the largest of its kind on Rikitea, and in its place, St. Michael's Cathedral, Rikitea was built, which became the largest church in the South Pacific islands. Maputeoa was baptized at Church of Saint-Joseph-de-Taku on Mangareva along with 160 other people of the kingdom. He took the name Gregorio after baptism in honor of Pope Gregory XVI who had deputed the missionaries to eastern Oceania, and solemnly placed his islands under the protection of the Blessed Virgin Mary.

Maputeoa and his wife Maria Eutokia Toaputeitou had five children, two sons and three daughters, which survived infancy. The royal couple's five children include the eldest surviving son Joseph Gregorio II, a second son named Jean Népomucène after Saint John of Nepomuk, and three daughters: Agnès Tepairu, Philomèle, and Catherine, two of these girls became nuns in the Rouru Convent on Mount Duff.

Maputeoa died on 20 June 1857 of acute pleurisy or "the disease of the chest." He was succeeded as King of Mangareva by his young son, Joseph Gregorio II, with his widow Queen Maria Eutokia Toaputeitou as regent. King Joseph died childless after an eleven-year reign. After 1868, the island kingdom was ruled by regents until it was annexed by France in 1881. In 1977, French Polynesia issued a stamp with an image of Maputeoa. Maputeoa's crypt is located in the Chapelle St-Pierre behind St. Michael's Cathedral.

== Bibliography ==
- The American Philatelist. Vol. 91. Altoona, PA: American Philatelic Association. 1977.
- Cuzent, Gilbert (1872). Voyage aux îles Gambier (Archipel de Mangarèva). Paris: V. Masson et Fils.
- Deschanel, Paul Eugene Louis (1888). Les intérêts français dans l'océan Pacifique. Paris: Berger-Levrault et cie.
- Eskridge, Robert Lee (1931). Manga Reva: the Forgotten Islands. Indianapolis: The Bobbs-Merrill company.
- Garrett, John (1982). To Live Among the Stars: Christian Origins in Oceania. Suva, Fiji: Institute of Pacific Studies, University of the South Pacific. ISBN 978-2-8254-0692-2.
- Henige, David P. (1974). The Chronology of Oral Tradition: Quest for a Chimera. Oxford: Clarendon Press. ISBN 978-0-19-821694-0.
- Hordern, Miles (2014). Sailing the Pacific: A Voyage Across the Longest Stretch of Water on Earth, and a Journey into Its Past. New York: St. Martin's Press. ISBN 978-1-4668-7196-0.
- Laval, Honoré; Newbury, C. W.; O'Reilly, Patrick (1968). Mémoires pour servir à l'histoire de Mangareva: ère chrétienne, 1834-1871. Paris: Musée de l'Homme.
- Laval, Honoré (1842). "Missions of Eastern Oceania Letter of Father Laval, of the Society of Picpus to the Rev. Father Hilarion, of the Same Society". Annals of the Propagation of the Faith. Vol. III. London: Published for The Institution. pp. 155–164.
- Laval, Honoré (1859). "Extract from a Letter of Father Laval, of the Society of Picpus, to the Brothers Vincent and Alain". Annals of the Propagation of the Faith. Vol. XX. London: Published for The Institution. pp. 288–289.
- Lesson, A. (1846). "Océanie. Archipel de Mangareva (Iles Gambier)". Revue de l'Orient, de l'Algërie et des colonies. Paris. pp. 161–199.
- Kerchache, Jacques (2001). Sculptures, Africa, Asia, Oceania, Americas: Musée de Louvre, Pavillon des Sessions. Paris: Réunion des musées nationaux. ISBN 978-2-7118-4234-6.
- Kjellgren, Eric (2007). Oceania: Art of the Pacific Islands in the Metropolitan Museum of Art. New York: Metropolitan Museum of Art. ISBN 978-0-300-12030-1.
- Scarr, Deryck (2013). A History of the Pacific Islands: Passages Through Tropical Time. Abingdon, UK; New York: Routledge. ISBN 978-1-136-83789-0.
- Smith, S. Percy (1918). "Notes on the Mangareva, or Gambier group of islands, eastern Polynesia". Journal of the Polynesian Society. 27. Wellington, NZ: Polynesian Society: 115–131. Archived from the original on 23 July 2018.
- Stanley, David (1999). South Pacific Handbook. David Stanley. ISBN 978-1-56691-172-6.
- Williamson, Robert W. (2013). The Social and Political Systems of Central Polynesia. Cambridge: Cambridge University Press. ISBN 978-1-107-62582-2.
- Wiltgen, Ralph M. (2010). The Founding of the Roman Catholic Church in Oceania, 1825 to 1850. Eugene, OR: Wipf and Stock Publishers. ISBN 978-1-60899-536-3.
- Wiseman, Nicholas Patrick, ed. (1838). "Glance at the Institution for the Propagation of the Faith. London. 1837". The Dublin Review. Booker & Dolman. pp. 368–375.

Regnal titles
Preceded by Te Mateoa	King of Mangareva; 1830–1857	Succeeded by Joseph Gregorio II
