= Matua (priest) =

- High Priest and Regent of Mangareva
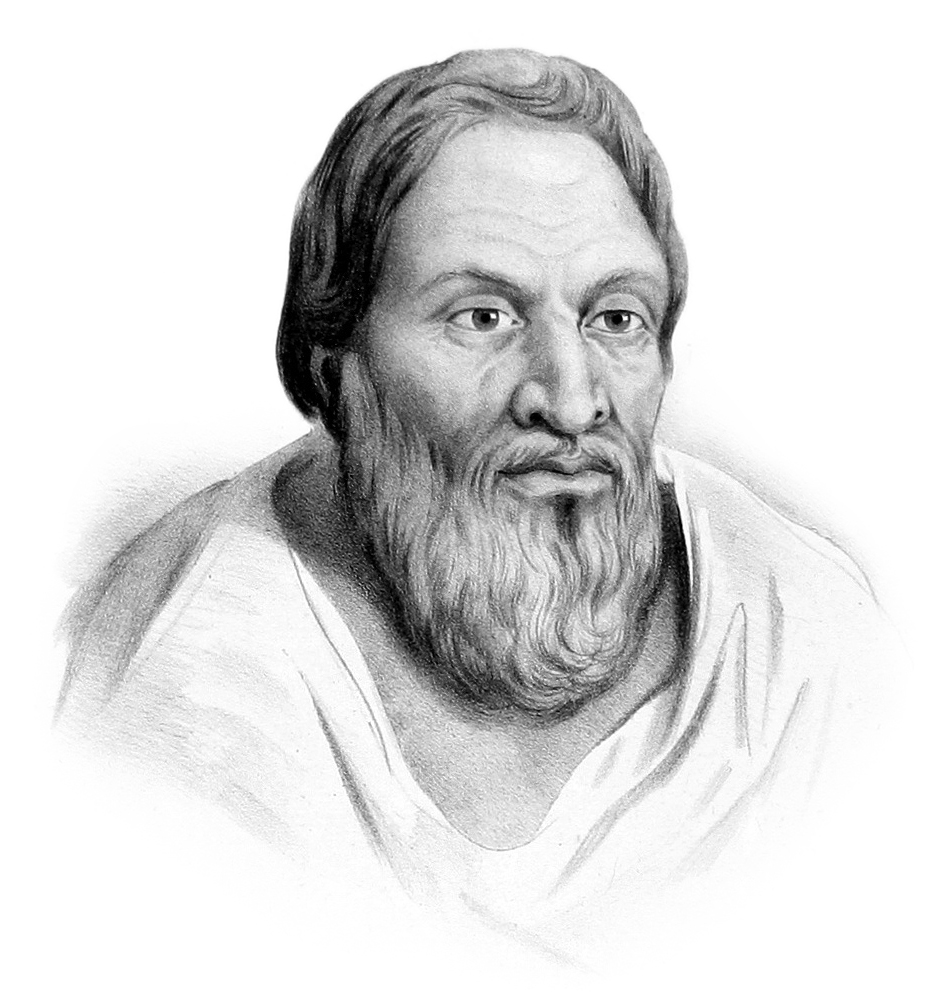
- Drawing of Matoua by Jacques Marescot du Thilleul, 1838
- Died: between 1840 and 1857
- Burial: Kara-Ea Cemetery
- Spouse: Toa-Matui
- Issue: Akakio Tematereikura
Names
- Maria Tepano Matua
- Father: Mateoa (or Mapurure)
- Mother: Terehi-kura
- Religion: Mangarevan; Roman Catholicism

Matua (baptized Maria Tepano or Marie-Etienne; fl. 1838) was the High Priest (taura tupua) of the island of Mangareva. He served as one of the regents for his nephew Maputeoa and was instrumental in the conversion of Mangareva and the Gambier Islands to Roman Catholicism. His name is often written as Matoua.

== Biography ==
Matua was the son of Terehi-kura and Mapurure (also known as Te Mateoa), the King or ʻAkariki (paramount chief) of Mangareva, who was known to be alive in 1825 and said to have died in 1830 or 1832. Because his elder brother Te Ikatohara was killed by sharks in about 1824, his son and Matua's nephew Maputeoa became king after Mapurure's death. Matua served as regent during the minority of his nephew and enjoyed the full trust of his people and may have had intentions of usurping power. As ʻakariki (paramount chief), the young king Maputeoa had complete authority over the kingdom, excepting his four uncles, who jointly owned the land with the king. The uncles' allegiance to the king was only formal.

In August 1834, French Pipcus missionaries, headed by Father Honoré Laval and Father François Caret from Chile of the order of the Congregation of the Sacred Hearts of Jesus and Mary, landed at Mangareva, but were rebuffed by the king. They managed to land on a small island where the local chief gave them support to learn the Mangareva language and the islanders learned about Christianity. Within one year of their arrival, the missionaries converted the islanders at Taravai, Aukena and Akamaru to Christianity, established churches, and even made the islanders wear tunics.

Father Caret and Father Laval eventually converted Matua and he donated the marae (temples) to the missionaries to build churches. Fearing the ulterior intentions of his uncle, Maputeoa began appearing in churches during mass. Matua and Maputeoa consented to the dismantling of the Te Keika marae, which was the largest of its kind on Rikitea, and in its place, St. Michael's Cathedral was built, which became the largest church in the South Pacific islands. Both uncle and nephew reconciled with each other around this time after the deathbed baptism of an aunt of the king. On 11 May 1835, Matua and his family were baptized. Matua had his long hair, sacred in the old pagan religion, cut short. He was baptized with the name Marie-Etienne, written as Maria Tepano in the Mangarevan language, in honor of Étienne Jérôme Rouchouze, the Vicar Apostolic of Eastern Oceania. King Maputeoa was baptized later on 25 August 1836 at the Church of Saint-Joseph-de-Taku on Mangareva along with 160 other people of the kingdom.

With his wife Toa-Matui, he had a son, Akakio Tematereikura, who served as regent of Mangareva in 1869. When French naval explorer Jules Dumont d'Urville visited Mangareva with the ships Astrolabe and Zélée in 1838, he met "Matoua" and his nephew King "Mapou-Teoa". Jacques Marescot du Thilleul, an artist with the expedition, drew a picture of the king, Matua, and another chief named "Mabou-Kouiké". Matua's exact date of death is unknown, although he was last described in French sources as alive in 1840. He was buried in a chapel at the Kara-Ea Cemetery.

== Bibliography ==
- Cuzent, Gilbert (1872). Voyage aux îles Gambier (Archipel de Mangarèva). Paris: V. Masson et Fils.
- Dumont d'Urville, Jules-Sébastien-César (1842). Voyage au pole sud et dans l'Océanie sur les corvettes l'Astrobale et la Zélée, exécuté par ordre du roi pendant les années 1837-1838-1839-1840. Vol. 3. Paris: Gide.
- Garrett, John (1982). To Live Among the Stars: Christian Origins in Oceania. Suva, Fiji: Institute of Pacific Studies, University of the South Pacific. ISBN 978-2-8254-0692-2.
- Hordern, Miles (2014). Sailing the Pacific: A Voyage Across the Longest Stretch of Water on Earth, and a Journey into Its Past. New York: St. Martin's Press. ISBN 978-1-4668-7196-0.
- Laval, Honoré; Newbury, C. W.; O'Reilly, Patrick (1968). Mémoires pour servir à l'histoire de Mangareva: ère chrétienne, 1834–1871. Paris: Musée de l'Homme.
- Laval, Honoré (1842). "Missions of Eastern Oceania Letter of Father Laval, of the Society of Picpus to the Rev. Father Hilarion, of the Same Society". Annals of the Propagation of the Faith. Vol. III. London: Published for The Institution. pp. 155–164.
- Kerchache, Jacques (2001). Sculptures, Africa, Asia, Oceania, Americas: Musée de Louvre, Pavillon des Sessions. Paris: Réunion des musées nationaux. ISBN 978-2-7118-4234-6.
- Scarr, Deryck (2013). A History of the Pacific Islands: Passages Through Tropical Time. Abingdon, UK; New York: Routledge. ISBN 978-1-136-83789-0.
- Williamson, Robert W. (2013). The Social and Political Systems of Central Polynesia. Cambridge: Cambridge University Press. ISBN 978-1-107-62582-2.
- Wiltgen, Ralph M. (2010). The Founding of the Roman Catholic Church in Oceania, 1825 to 1850. Eugene, OR: Wipf and Stock Publishers. ISBN 978-1-60899-536-3.
