= Temoe =

Small atoll of the Gambier Islands in French Polynesia

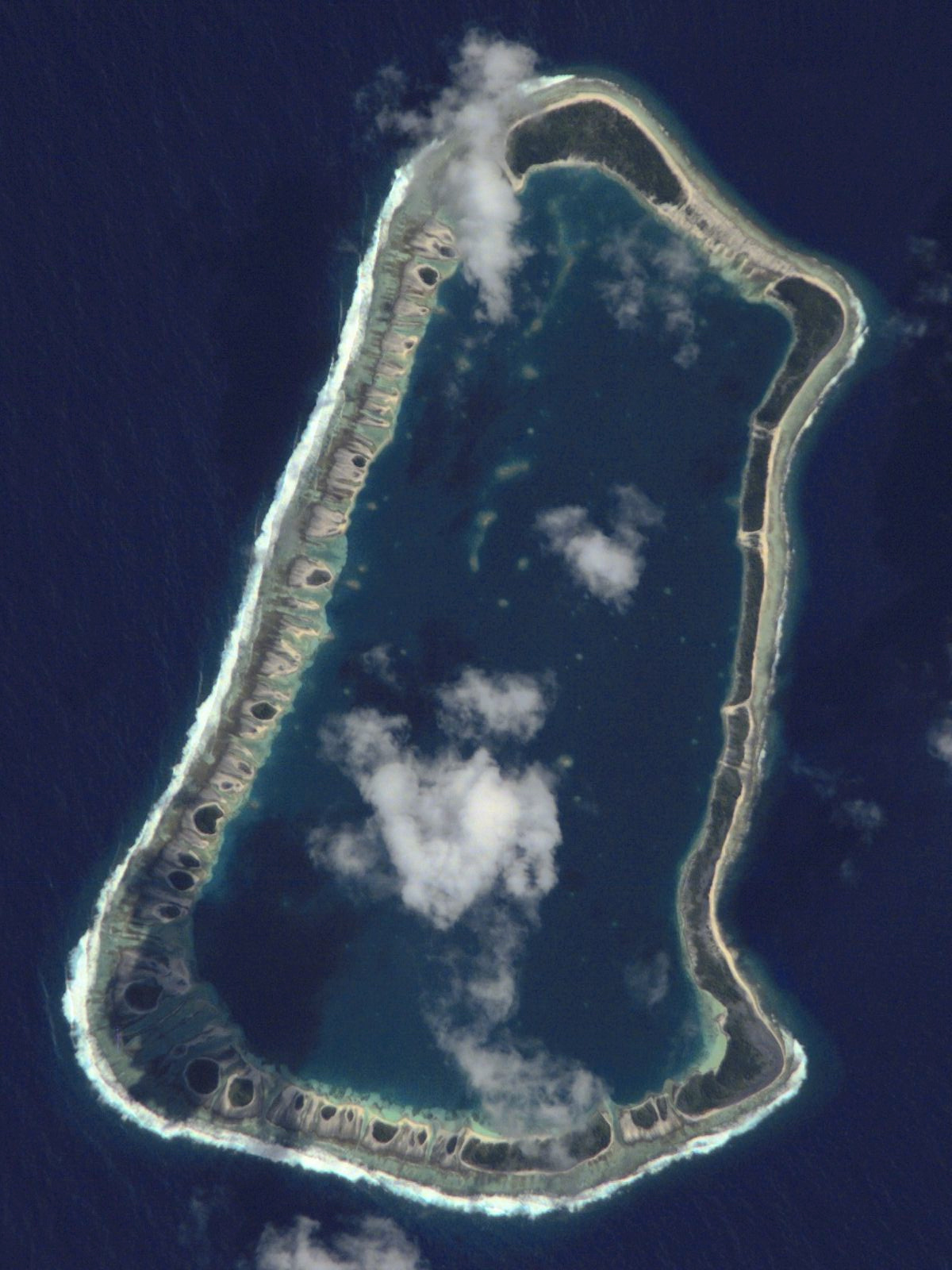
- NASA picture of Temoe Atoll

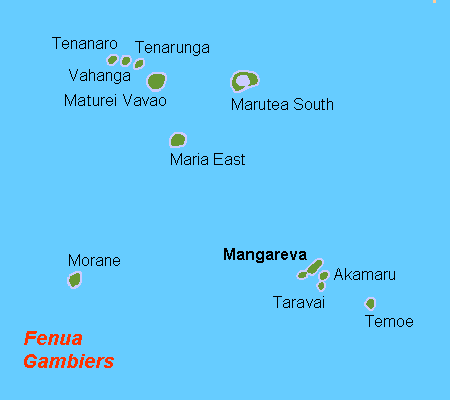
- Map of the commune of Gambier, showing to the north-west the islands that are part of the commune but belong to the Tuamotu Archipelago, and to the south-east the Gambier Islands proper (Mangareva, Akamaru, Taravai, Temoe).

- Location within French Polynesia

Geography
- Location: Pacific Ocean
- Coordinates: 23°20′30″S 134°28′50″W
- Archipelago: Tuamotus
- Area: 12 km^{2} (4.6 sq mi) (lagoon); 2.1 km^{2} (0.8 sq mi) (above water)
- Length: 6.8 km (4.23 mi)
- Width: 4.2 km (2.61 mi)

Administration
- France
- Overseas collectivity: French Polynesia
- Administrative subdivision: Îles Tuamotu-Gambier
- Commune: Gambier

Demographics
- Population: Uninhabited (2012)

Temoe, or Te Moe, is a small atoll of the Gambier Islands in French Polynesia. It is located in the far southeast of the Tuamotu group archipelago. It lies about 37 km southeast from the Gambier Islands and more than 1,700 kilometres (1,100 miles) southeast from Mataiva, at the other end of the Tuamotu archipelago.

Temoe Atoll is trapezoidal in shape and bound by a continuous reef with many small shallow spillways. It is 6.8 kilometres (4.2 miles) in length and has a maximum width of 4.2 kilometres (2.6 miles). The lagoon has a maximum depth of 23 metres (75 feet). Its islands are low and flat and the lagoon has no navigable pass to enter it.

Temoe is permanently uninhabited. Administratively it belongs to the commune of the Gambier Islands.

25 kilometres (16 miles) southwest of Temoe Atoll lies Portland Reef, a submerged shoal lying at a depth of about 10 metres (33 feet).

== History ==
Temoe was formerly inhabited. There are ancient Polynesian archaeological remains on this lonely atoll; foremost among these are temple structures (marae).

It is said that buccaneer Edward Davis might have arrived at Temoe and Mangareva in 1686; there is no historical proof of this.

The first recorded European to effectively arrive at Temoe was British mariner James Wilson on the ship Duff in 1797. Captain Wilson named this atoll "Crescent Island".

In 1838, Christian missionaries moved all the inhabitants of Temoe to Mangareva to help in construction work.

Rats were eradicated from Temoe Island in 2015. Their eradication was confirmed in 2020.

== See also ==
- Desert island
- List of islands
