= Mangareva =

Island of the Gambier Islands in French Polynesia

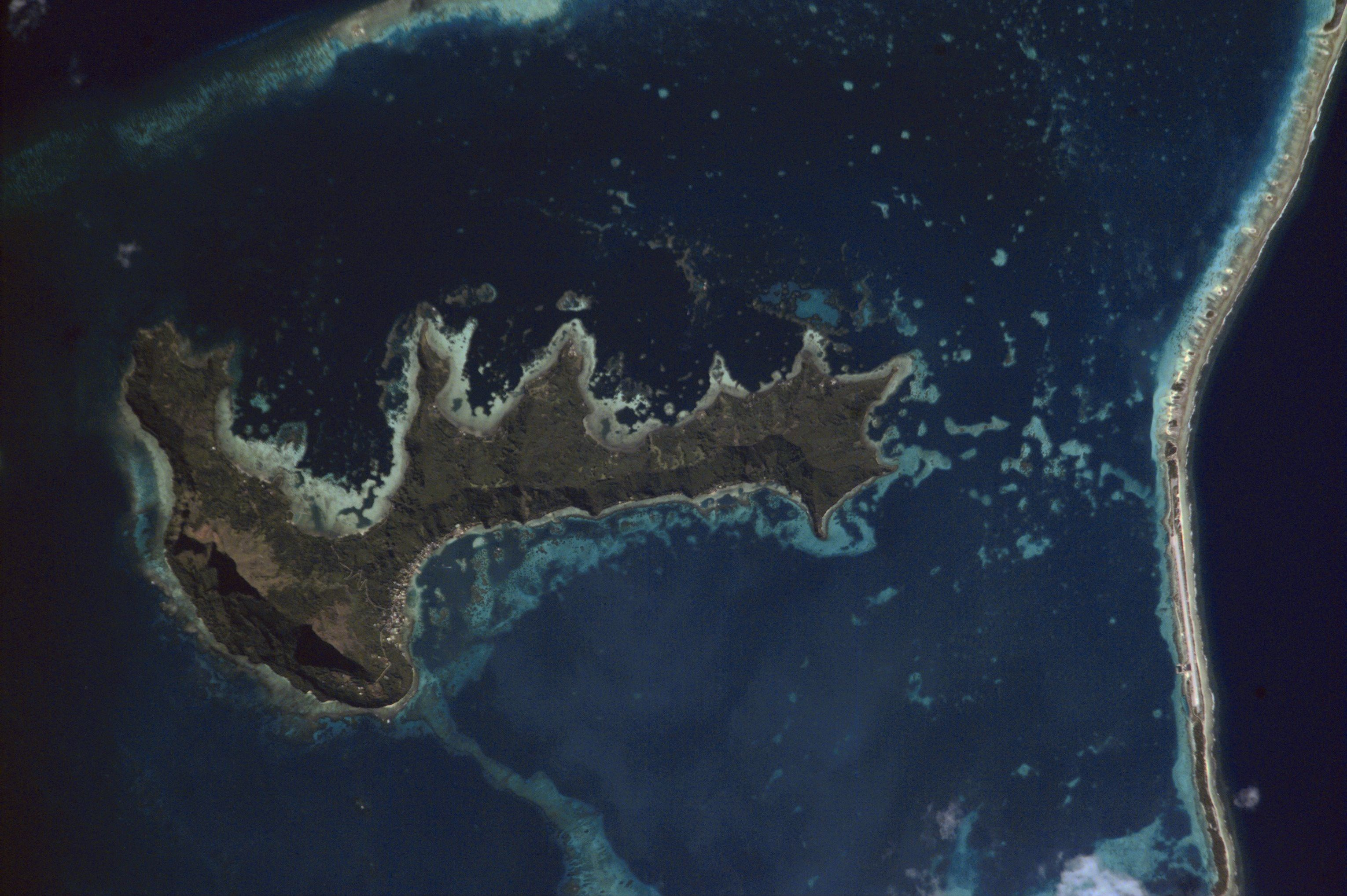
- NASA picture of Mangareva Island

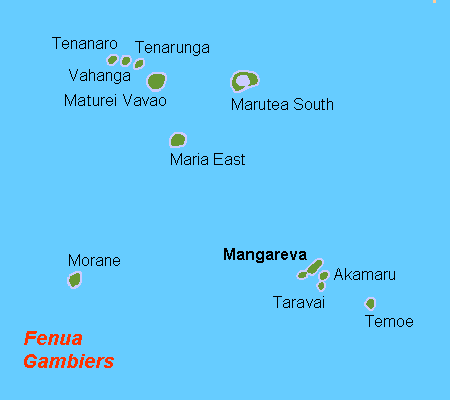
- Location of Mangareva within the Gambier Islands

- Location within French Polynesia

Geography
- Location: Pacific Ocean
- Coordinates: 23°06′35″S 134°58′15″W
- Archipelago: Gambier Islands
- Area: 15.4 km^{2} (5.9 sq mi)
- Length: 8 km (5 mi)
- Highest elevation: 441 m (1447 ft)
- Highest point: Mt. Duff
- Overseas collectivity: French Polynesia
- Administrative subdivision: Îles Tuamotu-Gambier
- Commune: Gambier
- Largest settlement: Rikitea

Demographics
- Population: 1,239 (2012)

Mangareva is the central and largest island of the Gambier Islands in French Polynesia. It is surrounded by smaller islands: Taravai in the southwest, Aukena and Akamaru in the southeast, and islands in the north. Mangareva has a permanent population of 1,239 (2012) and the largest village on the island, Rikitea, is the chief town of the Gambier Islands.

The island is approximately eight kilometres (5 mi) long and, at 15.4 km^{2} (5 15/16 sq mi), it comprises about 56% of the land area of the whole Gambier group. Mangareva has a high central ridge which runs the length of the island. The highest point in the Gambiers is Mount Duff, on Mangareva, rising to 441 metres (1,447 ft) along the island's south coast. The island has a large lagoon 24 kilometres (15 mi) in diameter containing reefs whose fish and shellfish helped ancient islanders survive much more successfully than on nearby islands with no reefs.

== History ==
Mangareva was first settled by Polynesians in the first millennium CE. While carbon dating has so far only dated settlements to 1160–1220, there is evidence from the Pitcairn Islands of trade with Mangareva from 1000 CE, and it is likely that settlement dates to around 800 CE. The island was once heavily forested and supported a large population that traded with other islands via canoes. However, excessive logging by the islanders between the 10th and 15th centuries resulted in deforestation of the island, with disastrous results for both its environment and its economy (see Gambier Islands for more details).

The first European to visit Mangareva was a British captain, James Wilson, who arrived in 1797 on the ship Duff. Wilson named the island group in honour of Admiral James Gambier, who had helped him to equip his vessel.

Mangareva and its dependencies in the Gambier Islands were ruled by a line of kings – and, later, regents – until the French formally annexed the islands. King Maputeoa requested a French protectorate on 16 February 1844, but the French government never ratified it. On 4 February 1870, the Mangarevan government and its prince regent, Arone Teikatoara, formally withdrew the protectorate request and asked the French not to intervene in the kingdom's affairs. However, after Father Honoré Laval was removed to Tahiti, the native government changed its stance: On 30 November 1871, Prince Regent Arone and the French colonial authority in Tahiti signed an agreement reaffirming the islands’ protectorate status. The Gambier Islands were finally annexed on 21 February 1881 under Prince Regent Bernardo Putairi, and the annexation was approved by the President of France on 30 January 1882.

In the 20th century, in July 1966, the Mangareviens were exposed to radioactive fallout due to the French military's nuclear tests at Moruroa and Fangataufa. Military officials were aware of the doses received by the island and their effects, but kept them secret. The information was made public in 1998 by journalist Vincent Jauvert, and acknowledged by the French government in 2006.

== Geography ==
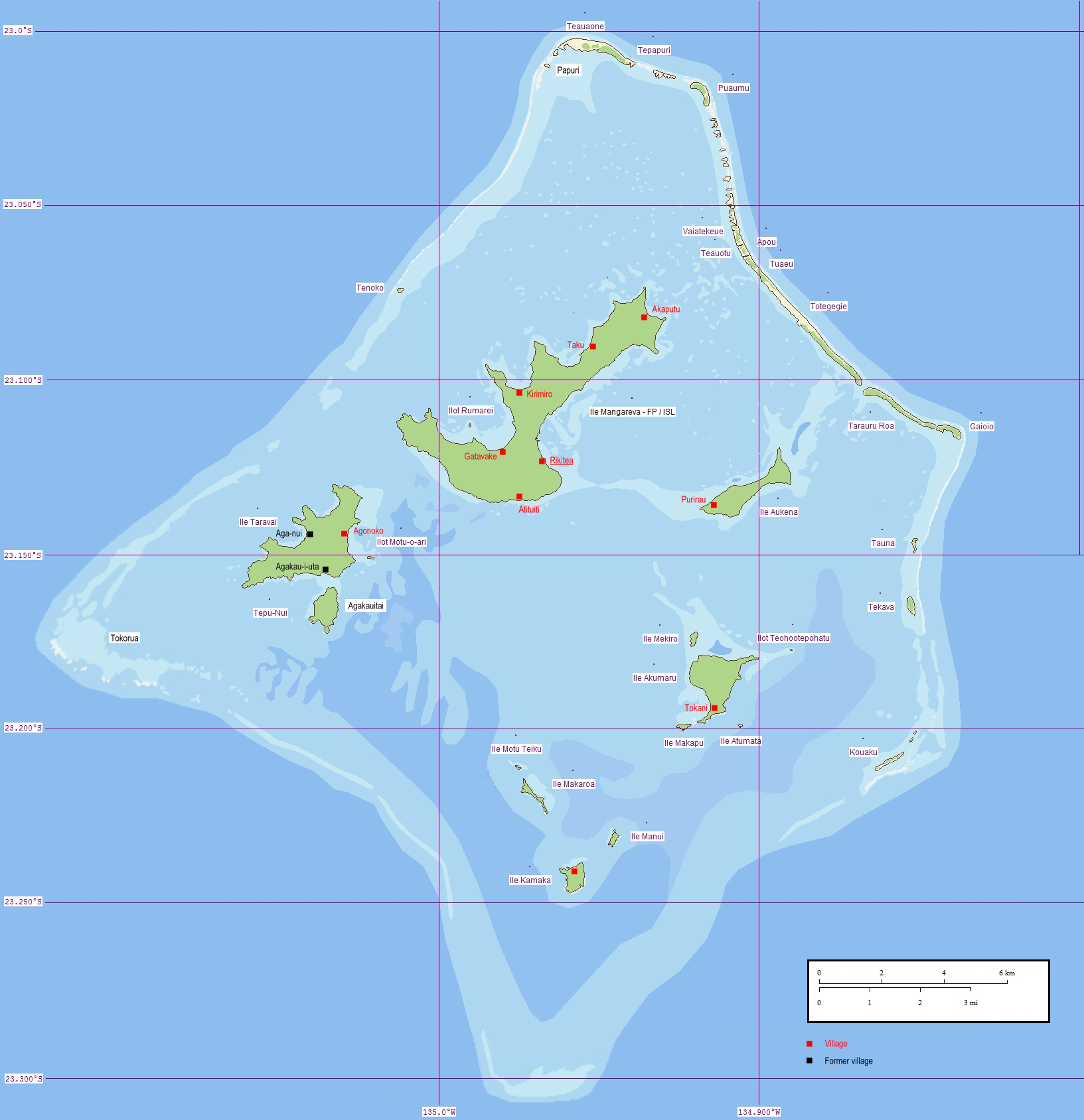
Map of Mangareva and surrounding islands

=== Climate ===
Mangareva has a tropical rainforest climate (Köppen climate classification Af). The average annual temperature in Mangareva is 23.5 °C (74.3 °F). The average annual rainfall is 1,913.5 mm (75.33 in) with November the wettest month. The temperatures are highest on average in March, at around 26.0 °C (78.8 °F), and lowest in August, at around 21.3 °C (70.3 °F). The highest temperature ever recorded in Mangareva was 31.4 °C (88.5 °F) on 6 March 2016; the coldest temperature ever recorded was 13.2 °C (55.8 °F) on 27 August 1992.

Climate data for Mangareva (1991–2020 averages, extremes 1980–present)
Month	Jan	Feb	Mar	Apr	May	Jun	Jul	Aug	Sep	Oct	Nov	Dec	Year
Record high °C (°F)	31.2 (88.2)	30.8 (87.4)	31.4 (88.5)	30.9 (87.6)	29.6 (85.3)	27.5 (81.5)	26.9 (80.4)	28.1 (82.6)	27.7 (81.9)	28.5 (83.3)	29.1 (84.4)	30.1 (86.2)	31.4 (88.5)
Mean daily maximum °C (°F)	28.0 (82.4)	28.3 (82.9)	28.4 (83.1)	27.0 (80.6)	25.4 (77.7)	24.1 (75.4)	23.4 (74.1)	23.5 (74.3)	23.8 (74.8)	24.6 (76.3)	25.8 (78.4)	27.0 (80.6)	25.8 (78.4)
Daily mean °C (°F)	25.5 (77.9)	25.8 (78.4)	26.0 (78.8)	24.9 (76.8)	23.4 (74.1)	22.2 (72.0)	21.4 (70.5)	21.3 (70.3)	21.5 (70.7)	22.3 (72.1)	23.5 (74.3)	24.7 (76.5)	23.5 (74.3)
Mean daily minimum °C (°F)	23.1 (73.6)	23.4 (74.1)	23.6 (74.5)	22.7 (72.9)	21.4 (70.5)	20.3 (68.5)	19.5 (67.1)	19.1 (66.4)	19.3 (66.7)	20.1 (68.2)	21.2 (70.2)	22.3 (72.1)	21.3 (70.3)
Record low °C (°F)	18.5 (65.3)	19.3 (66.7)	18.3 (64.9)	17.8 (64.0)	16.0 (60.8)	15.6 (60.1)	13.9 (57.0)	13.2 (55.8)	14.6 (58.3)	14.4 (57.9)	16.6 (61.9)	15.7 (60.3)	13.2 (55.8)
Average precipitation mm (inches)	187.4 (7.38)	175.3 (6.90)	167.2 (6.58)	164.8 (6.49)	174.1 (6.85)	155.6 (6.13)	127.9 (5.04)	135.3 (5.33)	119.9 (4.72)	153.7 (6.05)	165.8 (6.53)	186.5 (7.34)	1,913.5 (75.33)
Average precipitation days (≥ 1.0 mm)	14.9	13.2	13.1	12.3	12.3	12.1	12.5	11.2	10.7	11.4	11.3	13.6	148.6
Mean monthly sunshine hours	216.7	194.4	203.5	155.3	142.5	123.4	135.7	154.8	150.7	164.7	174.1	180.5	1,996.1
Source: Météo-France

== Transportation ==
Mangareva is reached by boat from the nearby airport across the lagoon.

Mangareva is an important travel link to Pitcairn Island. Practically the only way a traveler can reach Pitcairn Island is to fly to Tahiti, then to Mangareva. From there, a 32-hour boat ride will take the traveler to the island. Some reach Pitcairn by commercial shipping traffic, but that is uncommon, because shipping lanes do not typically pass close to Pitcairn.

== Culture and fiction ==
Painter and author Robert Lee Eskridge's book Manga Reva: The Forgotten Islands (Bobbs Merrill; 1931) offers first-hand observations of the environment, peoples, and traditions of Mangareva. It includes original illustrations and photographs by the author. In 1962, the adventure-fiction writer Garland Roark acknowledged Eskridge's work in a foreword to his novel, The Witch of Manga Reva. Eskridge also wrote and illustrated a children's book about his visit to Mangareva: South Sea Playmates (Bobbs Merrill; 1933). Sailor and author W. I. B. (Bill) Crealock describes in his book Cloud of Islands a visit to Mangareva, which he considered the ideal island, on the yacht Arthur Rogers, in the company of Diana and Tom Hepworth, whose lives were later recounted in the book Faraway by Lucy Irvine.

=== Binary counting system ===
The Mangarevan people developed a binary number system centuries ahead of Europeans. In 2013, the islanders were discovered to have developed a novel binary system that allowed them to reduce the number of digits involved in binary counting: for example, representing 150 requires eight digits in binary (10010110) but only four in the Mangarevan system (VTPK, where V (varu) means 80, T (tataua) is 40, P (paua) is 20, and K (takau) is 10). As binary counting is unknown in other Polynesian societies, it most likely developed after Mangareva was settled (which was sometime between 1060 and 1360 AD). Since Gottfried Leibniz would not invent the modern binary number system until 1689, the Mangarevan binary steps prefigured the European invention of binary by as many as 300 to 600 years.

In 2020, Mangarevan binary counting was shown to be an extension of a traditional Polynesian method of counting. Polynesian societies are known to count specific types of objects differently, and they count objects both singly (one by one) and collectively (by twos, fours, or eights). In each case, counting remains decimal (one, two, three...), though the unit counted varies (one, two, four, or eight). In Mangareva, counting collective items decimally produced productive terms for ten (takau or ten singles), twenty (paua or ten pairs), forty (tataua or ten groups of four), and eighty (varu or ten groups of eight). Given the availability of these terms and their associated numerical values, binary counting was then a simple adaptation of traditional Polynesian counting, which set aside every tenth item to mark ten of the items being counted (in New Zealand, this method was misunderstood by Europeans as undecimal or base-11 counting). In the traditional method, the pile of set-asides would then be counted the same way, with every tenth item marking a hundred (second round), thousand (third round), ten thousand items (fourth round), and so on. In Mangarevan binary, in the first round items were counted as before, but in the second round and thereafter they were grouped into eights (varu) and then fours (tataua), twos (paua), and singles (takau). Once counting had shifted to binary units in the second and subsequent rounds, the method was no longer decimal, suggesting an explanation for the upper limit of 800 (for items counted singly) observed for the counting system.

=== Mythology ===
Mangarevan mythology includes deities and gods commonly found across the Polynesian triangle. For instance, traditionally, in Mangareva, the most important god was named Tu, whereas in New Zealand, the god of war is named Tū, and in Hawai'i, the god of war was similarly named Kū. Other commonalities amongst the islands of the Polynesian triangle include the goddess Haumea, who is said to have been responsible for the creation of the world, and the demi-god Māui, who is said to have fished up the islands from the bottom of the sea.

== Gallery ==
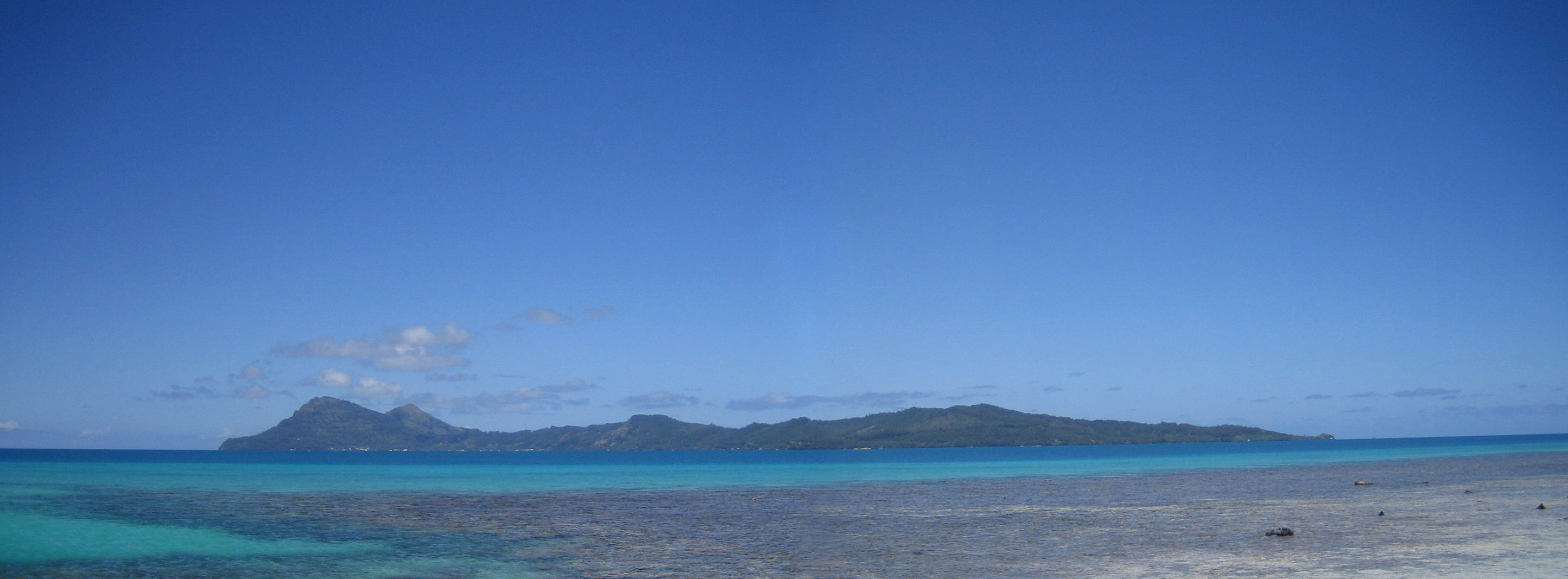
Mangareva Island, view from the Motu Totegegie

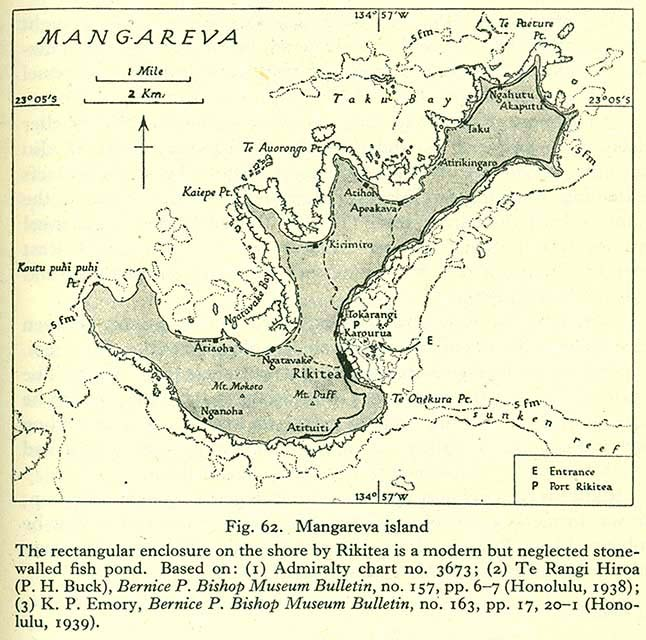
Map of Mangareva dated from 1938

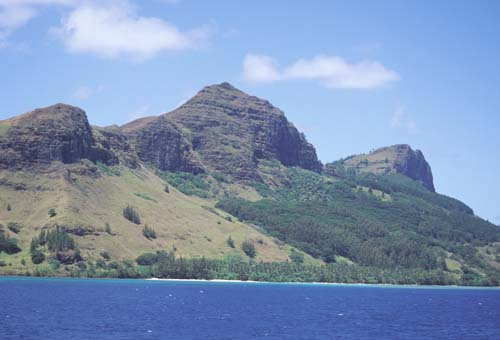
Mt. Duff, 370 m (1,200 ft), the only volcanic remnant of all the original volcanoes which made up the Tuamotu archipelago

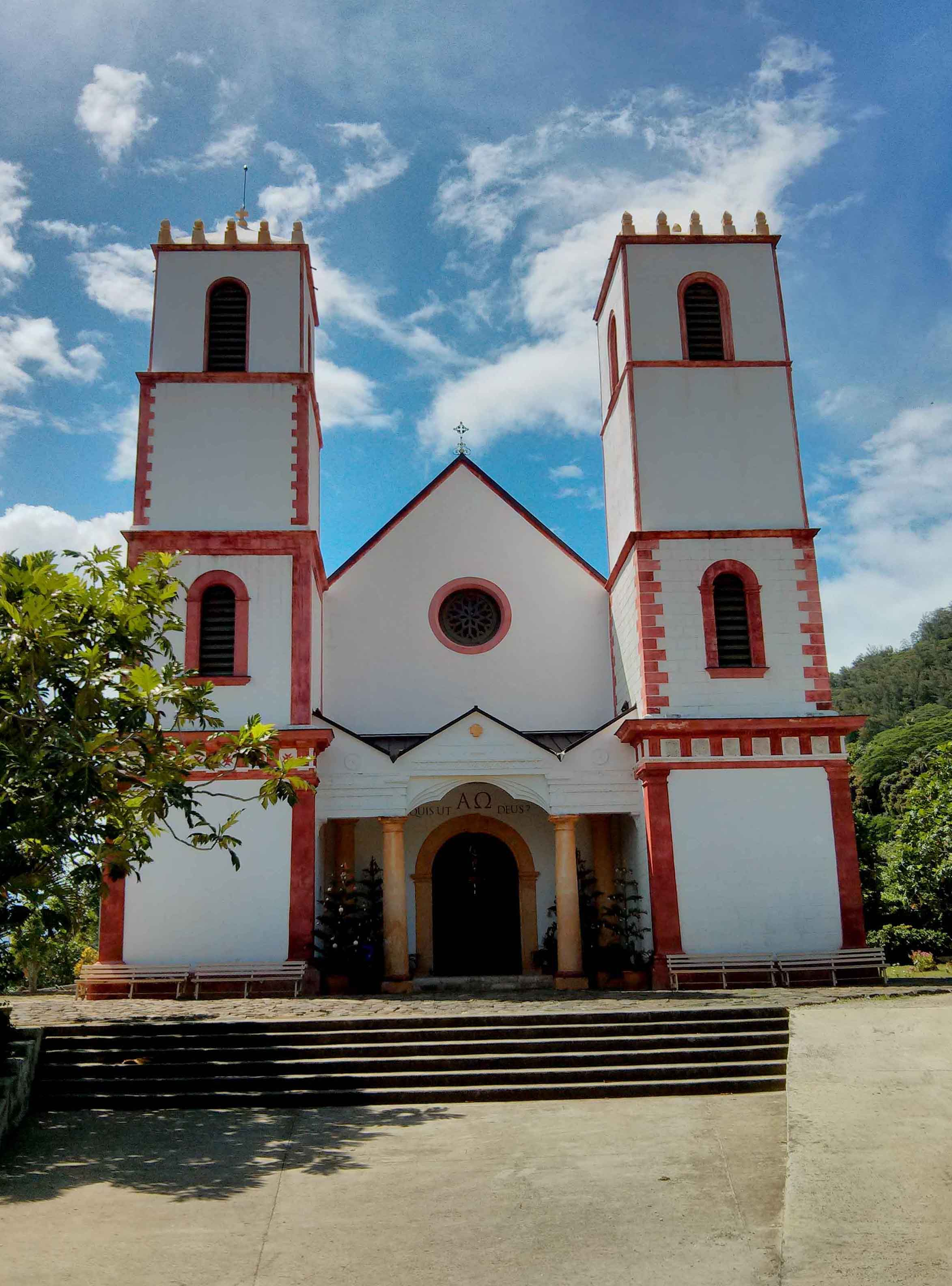
St Michael's Cathedral on Mangareva island

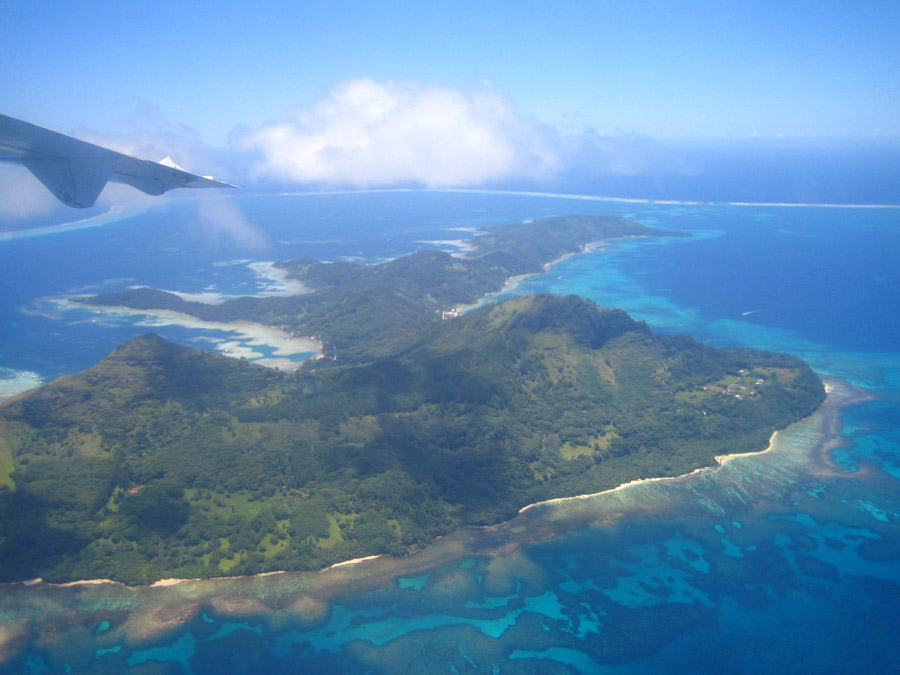
Aerial view

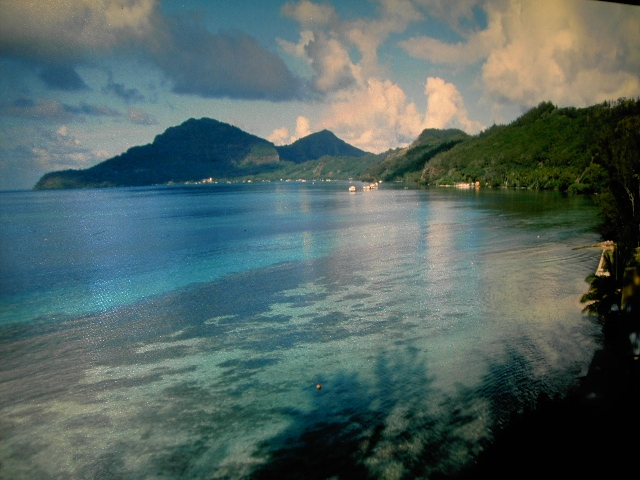
Coastal view

== See also ==
- List of volcanoes in French Polynesia
