= Morane (French Polynesia) =

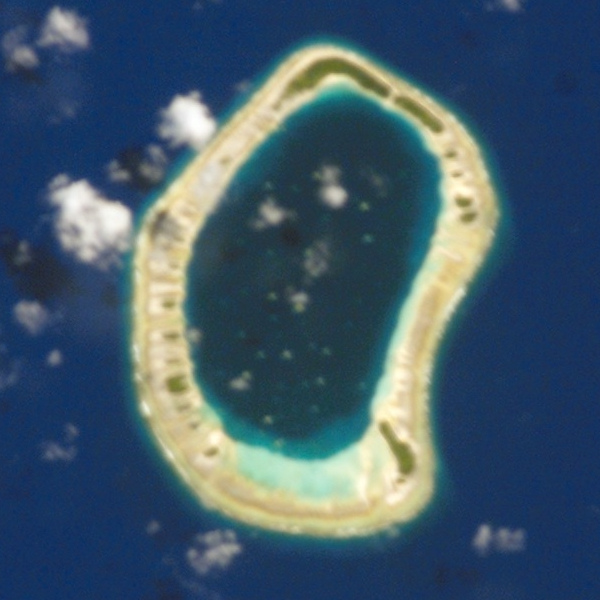
- NASA picture of Morane Atoll.

- Location within French Polynesia

Geography
- Location: Pacific Ocean
- Coordinates: 23°10′S 137°08′W
- Archipelago: Tuamotus
- Area: 11 km^{2} (4.2 sq mi) (lagoon); 2.85 km^{2} (1.1 sq mi) (above water)
- Length: 5.8 km (3.6 mi)
- Width: 3.5 km (2.17 mi)

Administration
- France
- Overseas collectivity: French Polynesia
- Administrative subdivision: Îles Tuamotu-Gambier
- Commune: Gambier

Demographics
- Population: Uninhabited (2012)

Morane is an uninhabited small isolated atoll of the Tuamotu Archipelago in French Polynesia. It is located 153 km southwest of Maria Est, its closest neighbour. Morane Atoll is the southernmost atoll of the Tuamotus proper. It measures 5.8 km in length, 3.5 km in width and has a land area of 2.85 km^{2}. The lagoon has an area of 11 km^{2} and has no passes. The islands on its reef are covered with screw pine (Pandanus) and coconut trees.

== History ==
The first recorded westerner to sight Morane Atoll was Captain Samuel Grimwood of the Discoverer, owned by the naturalist Hugh Cuming, on 15 January 1828. Its original name was Grimwood's Island. Cited as such in the "Pacific Island Names" atlas published by Bishop Museum Press, Hawaii, in 1986.

Another source gives it the name Cadmus, after the whaler Cadmus. The source gives the captain's name as Cary, and the year as 1832. Actually, Cadmus, Mayhew, master, was wrecked there on 4 August 1842.

== Administration ==
Administratively Morane Atoll belongs to the commune of the Gambier Islands.

== Ecology ==
By 2003, Morane Atoll holds one of the largest extant populations (approx. 50 individuals) of the critically endangered Polynesian ground-dove. It also has one of the highest concentrations of the Tuamotu sandpiper (Prosobonia cancellata), with approximately 150 to 200 individuals of the species.

== See also ==
- Desert island
- List of islands
