= Tepoto =

Tepoto is the name of two atolls in the Tuamotu Archipelago of French Polynesia:

- Tepoto (North), an atoll in the Disappointment Islands
- Tepoto (South), a group of three small atolls in the Raeffsky Islands of central Tuamotu
