= Narunga =

Narunga may refer to:

- Tenarunga (also called Narunga), an atoll in French Polynesia
- Narungga, a group of Australian Aboriginals
