= Vahanga =

Atoll in the Tuamotu archipelago, French Polynesia

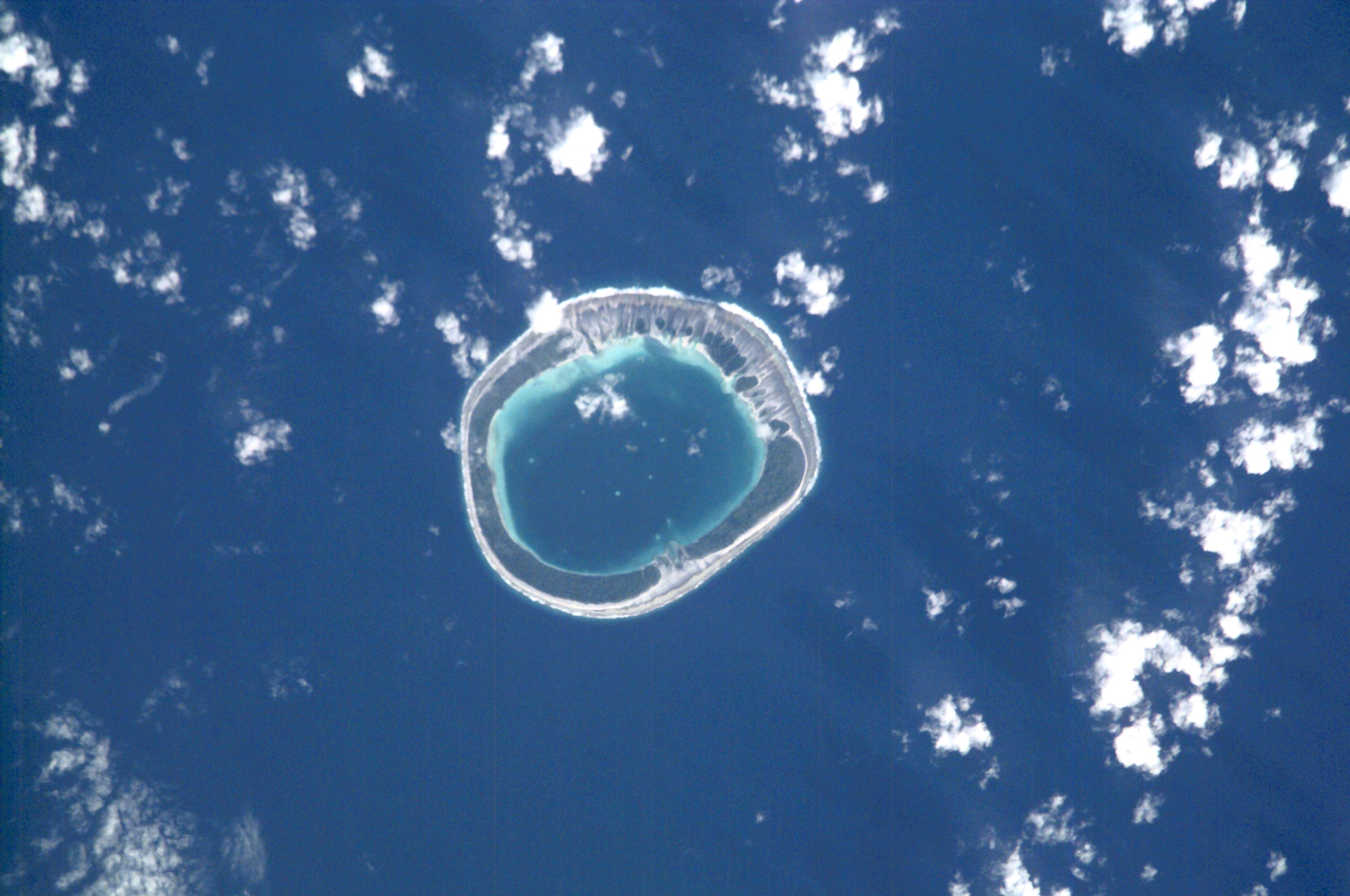
- NASA picture of Vahanga Atoll

- Location within French Polynesia

Geography
- Location: Pacific Ocean
- Coordinates: 21°19′S 136°39′W
- Archipelago: Tuamotus
- Area: 12.6 km^{2} (4.9 sq mi) (lagoon); 3.8 km^{2} (1.5 sq mi) (above water)
- Width: 3.6 km (2.24 mi)

Administration
- France
- Overseas collectivity: French Polynesia
- Administrative subdivision: Îles Tuamotu-Gambier
- Commune: Gambier

Demographics
- Population: Uninhabited (2012)

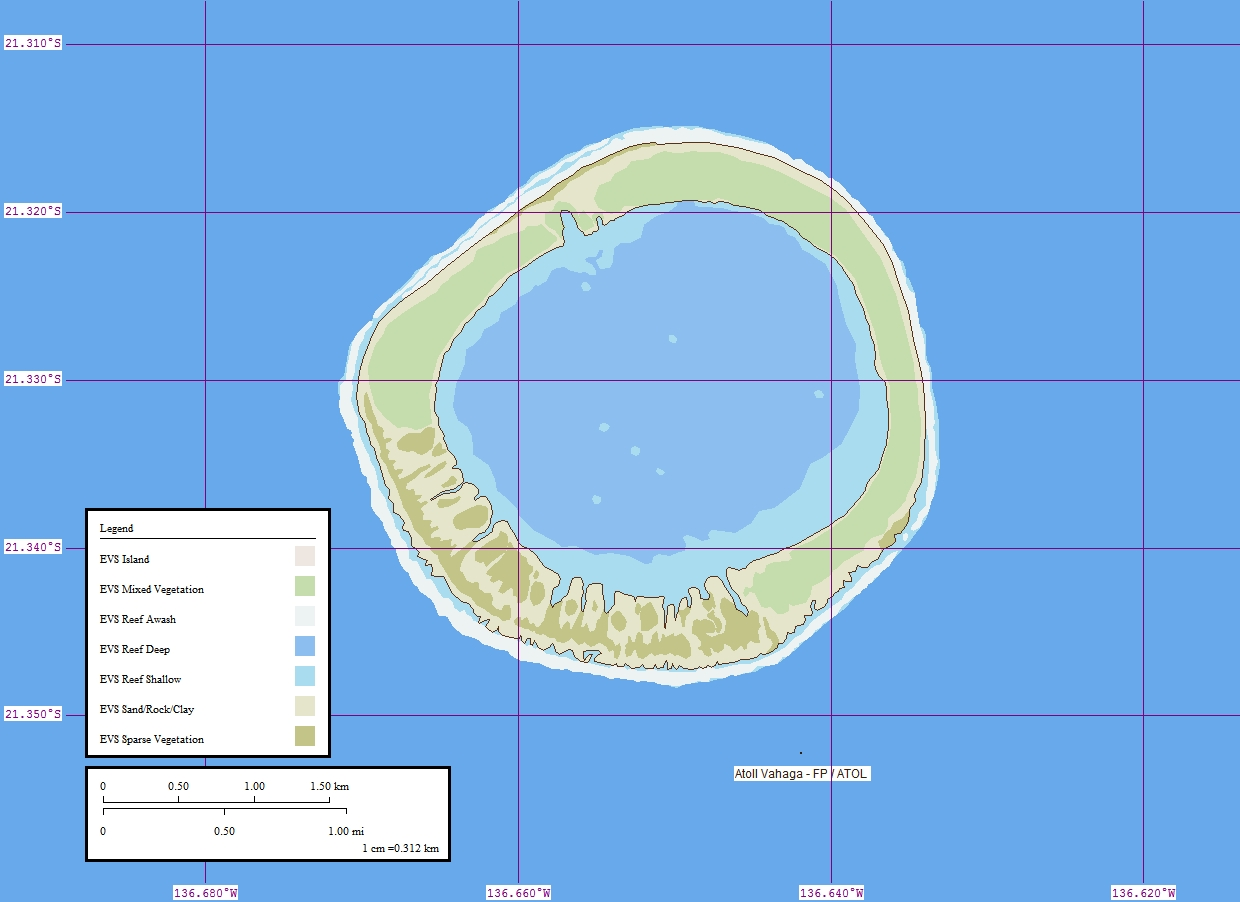
Map of Vahanga

Vahanga is a small uninhabited atoll part of the Acteon Group in the Tuamotu archipelago, French Polynesia and belongs to the municipality of the Gambier Islands.

== Geography ==
Vahanga is located 9 km west of Tenarunga and 1362 km southeast of Tahiti. It is a circular atoll with a diameter of 3.6 km and an area of 3.8 km^{2} (12.6 km^{2} lagoon inclusive). It is a low atoll with a landing place on the northwest side of the island near a white house, but there is no access to the lagoon.

== History ==
The first recorded sighting of this atoll was made during the Spanish expedition of the Portuguese navigator Pedro Fernández de Quirós on 5 February 1606 under the name Las Cuatro Coronadas (the "four crowned" (by coconut palms)), however these observations were not fully documented. As such, the first unambiguous approach to the island was made in 1833 by navigator Thomas Ebrill on his merchant vessel Amphitrite and again in 1837 by Lord Edward Russell, commander of the H.M.S Actaeon, the name given to the group. It was previously owned by a man named Captain Nicholas but was redeemed in 1934.

== Flora and fauna ==
Vahanga hosts a flora composed of coconut trees, Portulaca lutea, Cassytha filiformis, and Amaranthaceae such as the species Achyranthes aspera var. velutina.

In 2007, an ecological project conducted by the University of Auckland and the Ornithological Society of Polynesia aimed to eradicate Vahanga's Polynesian rats, which had colonized the atoll, to restore balance to the ecosystem supporting bird species such as the Polynesian ground-dove and the Tuamotu sandpiper. A previous campaign in 2000 had failed in this goal.

In 2015 a conservation campaign resulted in the eradication of rats from the island.

== See also ==
- Matureivavao
- Tenararo
- Tenarunga
- Acteon Group
- Desert island
- List of islands
