= Robert Wan Pearl Museum =

Museum in Tahiti, French Polynesia

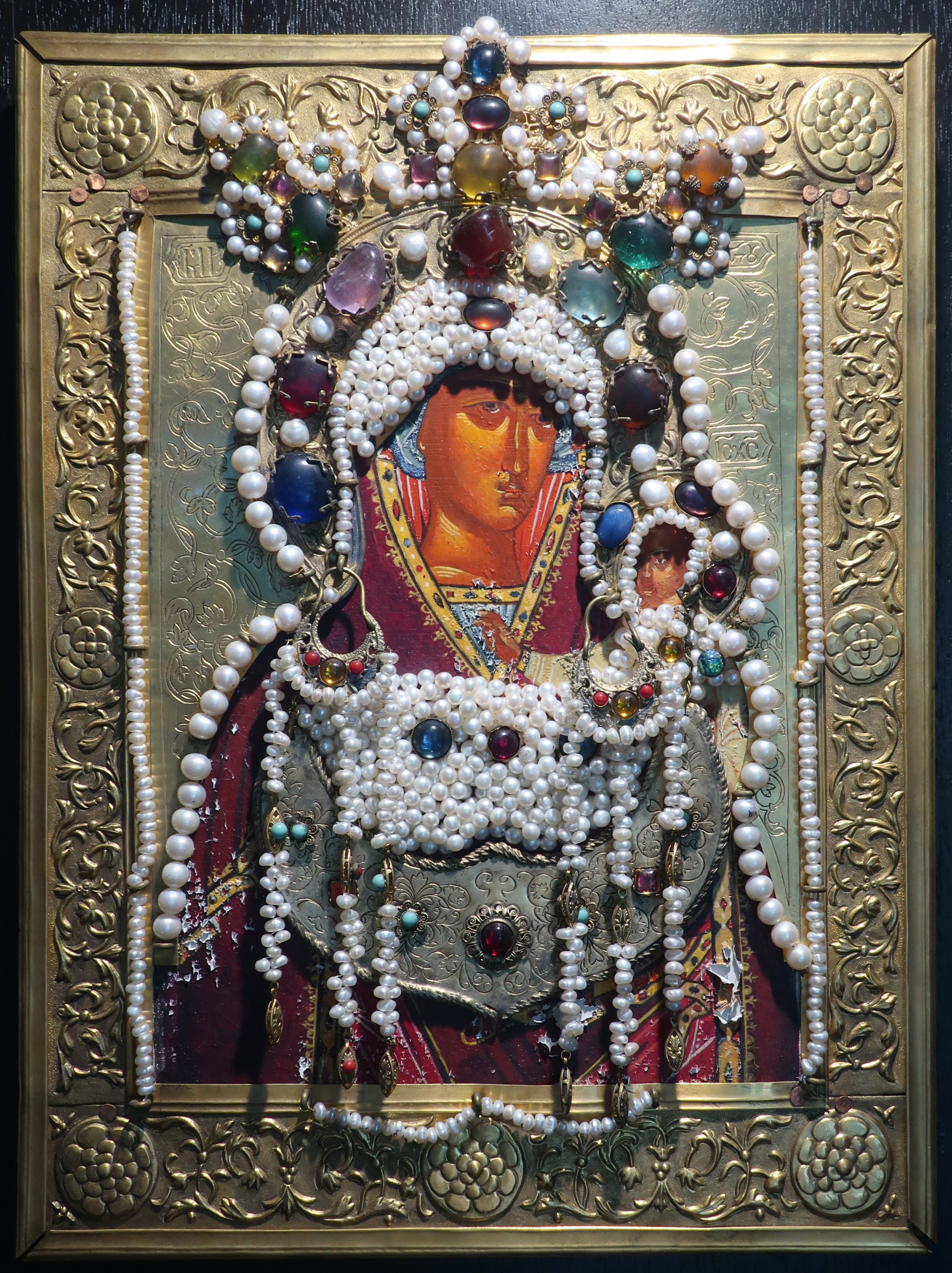
- Icon decorated with pearls and gemstones on display at the museum
- Location: Papeete, Tahiti, French Polynesia
- Coordinates: 17°32′24″S 149°34′6″W
- Type: Museum
- Key holdings: Pearls

The Robert Wan Pearl Museum is the world's only museum dedicated to pearls. It is in Papeete, Tahiti, the capital of French Polynesia.

== Overview ==
The Pearl Museum recounts the history of the pearl throughout the world, the fascination it aroused in important persons, the legends, the habits, and the technical sides of pearliculture. Robert Wan's private collection is on exhibit, featuring the largest Tahitian pearl in the world.
