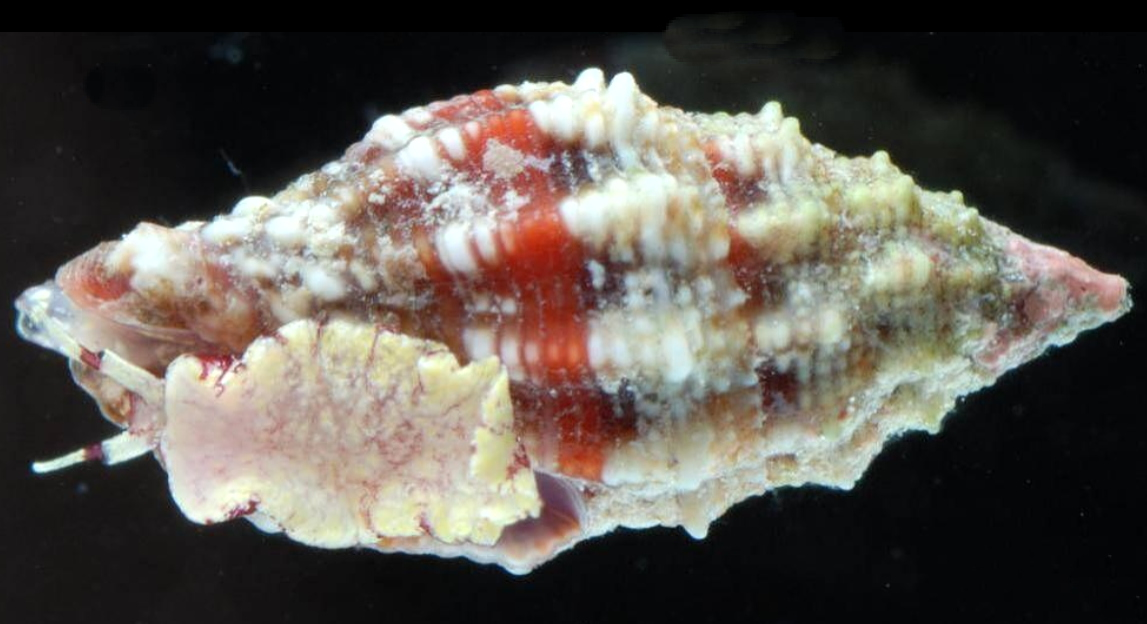
- Vexillum roseum (specimen at the Smithsonian Institution)

Scientific classification
- Kingdom: Animalia
- Phylum: Mollusca
- Class: Gastropoda
- Subclass: Caenogastropoda
- Order: Neogastropoda
- Family: Costellariidae
- Genus: Vexillum
- Species: V. roseum

Binomial name
- Vexillum roseum (Broderip, 1836)

Synonyms
- Mitra breviacaudata Sowerby, 1874; Tiara rosea Broderip, 1836 (original combination); Turricula (Costellaria) appellii Jickeli, 1874; Turricula (Costellaria} pharaonis A. Adams, 1872; Vexillum (Costellaria) roseum (Broderip, 1836) ·

= Vexillum roseum =

Species of gastropod

Vexillum roseum, common name the rose mitre, is a species of small sea snail, marine gastropod mollusk in the family Costellariidae, the ribbed miters.

== Description ==
The length of the shell varies between 7 mm and 10.3 mm.

The shell is ovate, the spire turreted. The whorls are slightly angulated round the upper part. The shell is longitudinally ribbed, the ribs prickly noduled or tubercled at the angle, transversely strongly elevately striated. The shell is pinkish purple, banded with white, dotted with brown between the ribs. The columella is four-plaited.

The shell is purple-rose, tipped with white on the ribs; sometimes with a row of dark spots between the ribs and below the shoulder.

The shell is medium in size, slender, fusiform, solid. The whorls are slightly turreted. The suture is impressed. The aperture measures less than half the height of shell. The columella contains four plaits. The sculpture consists of strong, regularly spaced axial folds, overridden by closely set, flattened spiral ribs.

== Distribution ==
This marine species occurs in the Red Sea; off Mauritius; off the Philippines and Tahiti, the Tuamotu Islands and South Marutea, Lord Hood's Island.

Fossils have been found in Pleistocene strata on Eniwetok, Marshall Islands.

== Habitat ==
Sometimes seen from dredgings, at depths around 80 meters.
