= Tenararo =

Atoll in the Tuamotu Islands in French Polynesia

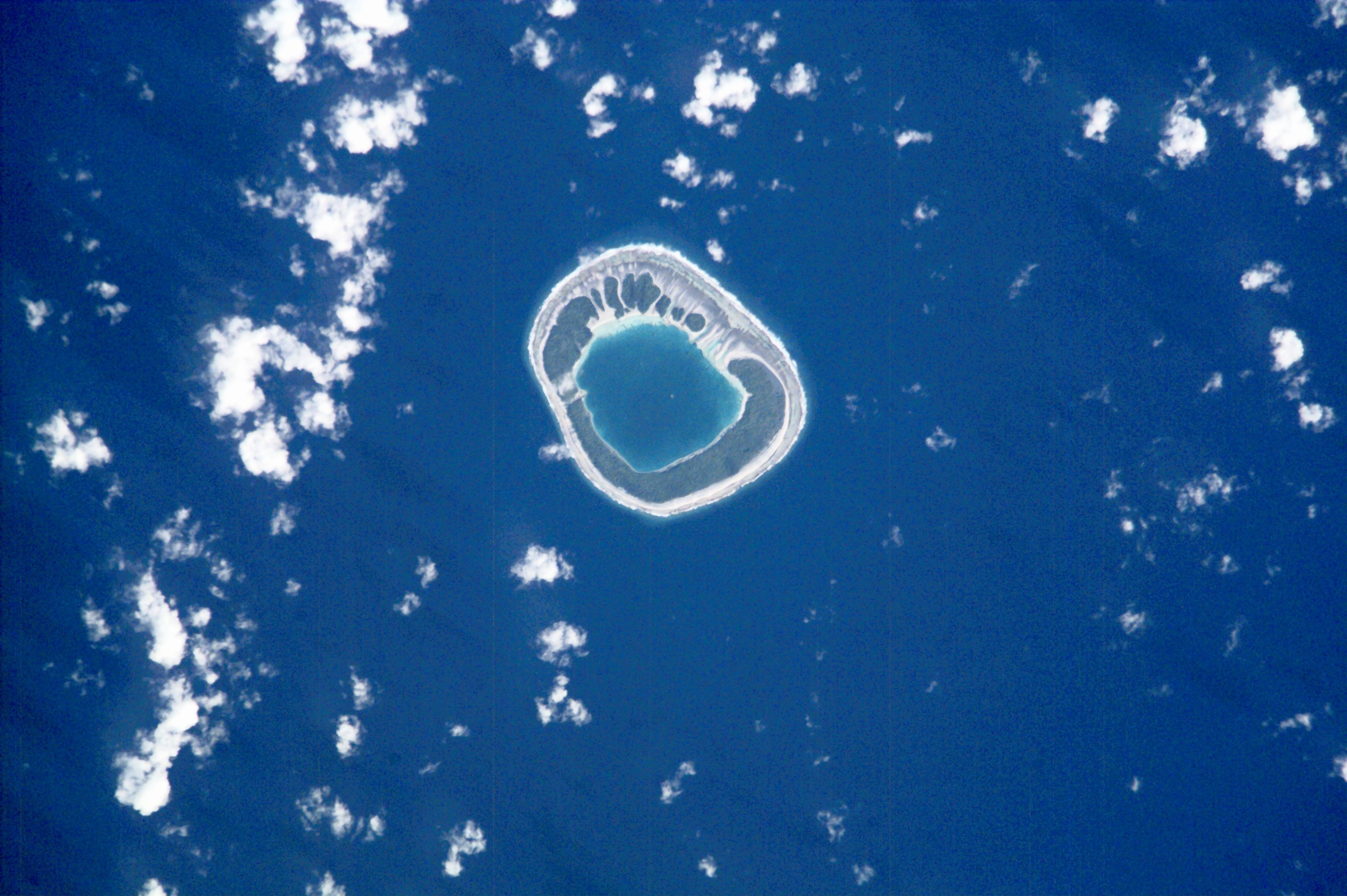
- NASA picture of Tenararo Atoll

- Location within French Polynesia

Geography
- Location: Pacific Ocean
- Coordinates: 21°18′S 136°45′W
- Archipelago: Tuamotus
- Area: 2 km^{2} (0.77 sq mi) (lagoon); 1.6 km^{2} (0.6 sq mi) (above water)

Administration
- France
- Overseas collectivity: French Polynesia
- Administrative subdivision: Îles Tuamotu-Gambier
- Commune: Gambier

Demographics
- Population: Uninhabited (2012)

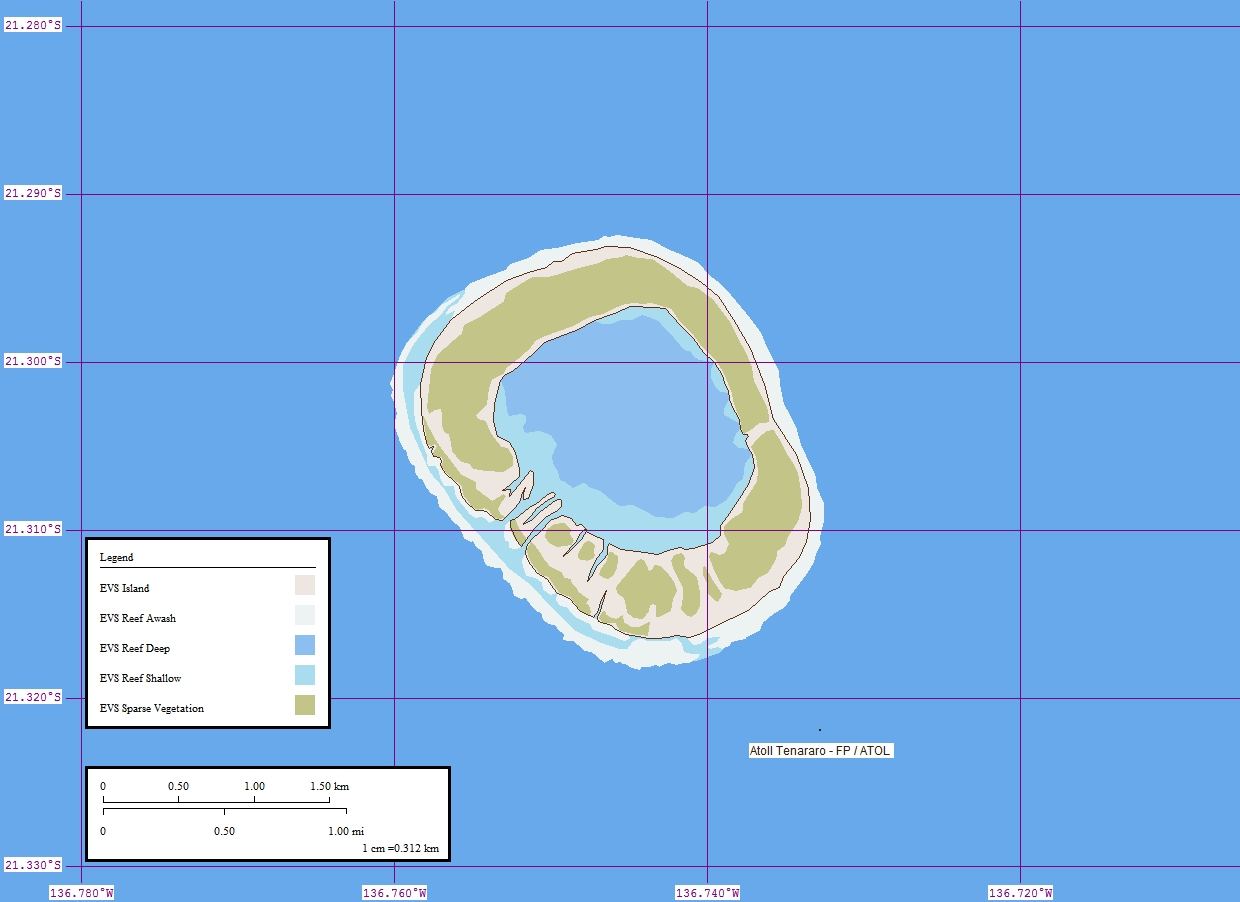
Map of Tenararo Atoll

Tenararo is the smallest atoll in the Acteon Group in the southeastern part of the Tuamotu Islands in French Polynesia. It is administratively a part of the Gambier Islands. It is uninhabited.

== Geography ==
Tenararo is located 6 kilometres (4 miles) west of Vahanga, the nearest island, 115 kilometres (71 miles) west of the Gambier Islands and 1,370 kilometres (850 miles) southeast of Tahiti. It is a circular atoll with a land area of 1.6 square kilometres (0.6 square miles) and a land area of 2 square kilometres (0.8 square miles). The atoll has a landing place on its NW side between the small boulders which encumber the reef. There is no entrance to the lagoon.

== History ==
The first recorded sighting of this atoll was made during the Spanish expedition of the Portuguese navigator Pedro Fernández de Quirós on 5 February 1606 under the name Las Cuatro Coronadas (the "four crowned" (by coconut palms)), however these observations were not fully documented. As such, the first unambiguous approach to the island was made on 14 March 1828 by the explorer Hugh Cuming in his ship the Discoverer captained by Samuel Grimwood. The next visit was in 1833 by navigator Thomas Ebrill on his merchant vessel Amphitrite and again in 1837 by Lord Edward Russell, commander of the H.M.S Actaeon, the name given to the group. It was previously owned by a man named Captain Nicholas but was redeemed in 1934.

In the nineteenth century, Tenararo became a French territory, with a population of about 20 Aboriginal people in 1850.

== Flora and fauna ==
The atoll is an important habitat for many endangered species. Species such as the Polynesian ground dove (of which there are less than 120 remaining in the wild), atoll fruit dove, Tuamotu sandpiper, bristle-thighed curlew and Murphy's petrel live on the island. The atoll is free of introduced mammalian predators, making it an essential conservational habitat.

== See also ==
- Matureivavao
- Tenarunga
- Vahanga
- Acteon Group
- Desert island
- List of islands
