= Cadmus (1816 ship) =

History

United States
- Name: Cadmus
- Owner: Benjamin Rich & Co.
- Builder: T[hatcher] Magoun, Medford, Massachusetts
- Fate: Wrecked 4 August 1842

General characteristics
- Tons burthen: 316, or 320 (bm)

Cadmus was built in 1816 at Medford, Massachusetts. She made five complete voyages as a whaler, one out of Boston (1822–1825), and four out of Fairhaven, Massachusetts (1831–1841). She was lost in 1842 on an uncharted atoll in the Tuamotu Archipelago (23°10′S 137°07′W), that for a time was known as Cadmus Island, and is now known as Morane.

== Career ==
1st whaling voyage (1822–1825): Captain Nathanial Cray sailed from Boston in 1822. He returned in 1825 with 2000 barrels of whale oil.

2nd whaling voyage (1831–1834): Captain Frederick C. Taber sailed in 1831 from Fairhaven. He returned in 1834 with 2313 barrels of whale oil.

3rd whaling voyage (1834–1837): Captain William Crowell sailed in 1834 from Fairhaven. He returned in 1837 with 2063 barrels of whale oil.

4th whaling voyage (1838–1841): Captain Edwin L. Mayhew sailed in 1838 from Fairhaven. He returned in 1841 with 2002 barrels of oil.

5th whaling voyage (1841–loss): Captain Mayhew sailed from Fairhaven on 11 November 1841.

== Loss ==
On 3 August 1842, Cadmus, Captain Mayhew, struck an uncharted reef whose location Captain estimated at 23°26′S 138°00′W. The vessel quickly went to pieces, but captain and crew made it to the island in one of her boats. The captain, mate, and four men subsequently sailed to Tahiti, making the over 1000 mile journey in an open boat.

Captain Mayhew and his boat crew arrived at Tahiti on 21 August. There he chartered Emerald, Christopher Hall, master, to retrieve the men still on Cadmus Island. Hall returned to Tahiti on 21 September with 18 survivors.

Cadmus had been out nine months but had only gathered 40 barrels of oil. Five of the rescued men then joined Lucy Ann, on which Herman Melville had been a sailor until he and several other crew members had quit her in Tahiti, and had been charged with revolt and refusal to do their duty.

A report in an Australia newspaper stated that the American whaler Cadmus had been totally wrecked on St. John the Baptist's Island, near Pitcairn Island. It reported that she had 1200 barrels of oil aboard. The schooner Emerald had been despatched to bring the crew to Tahiti.

Captain Mayhew and the first mate, Mr. Norton, arrived at New Bedford prior to March 1843.
