= Napuka =

Atoll in French Polynesia

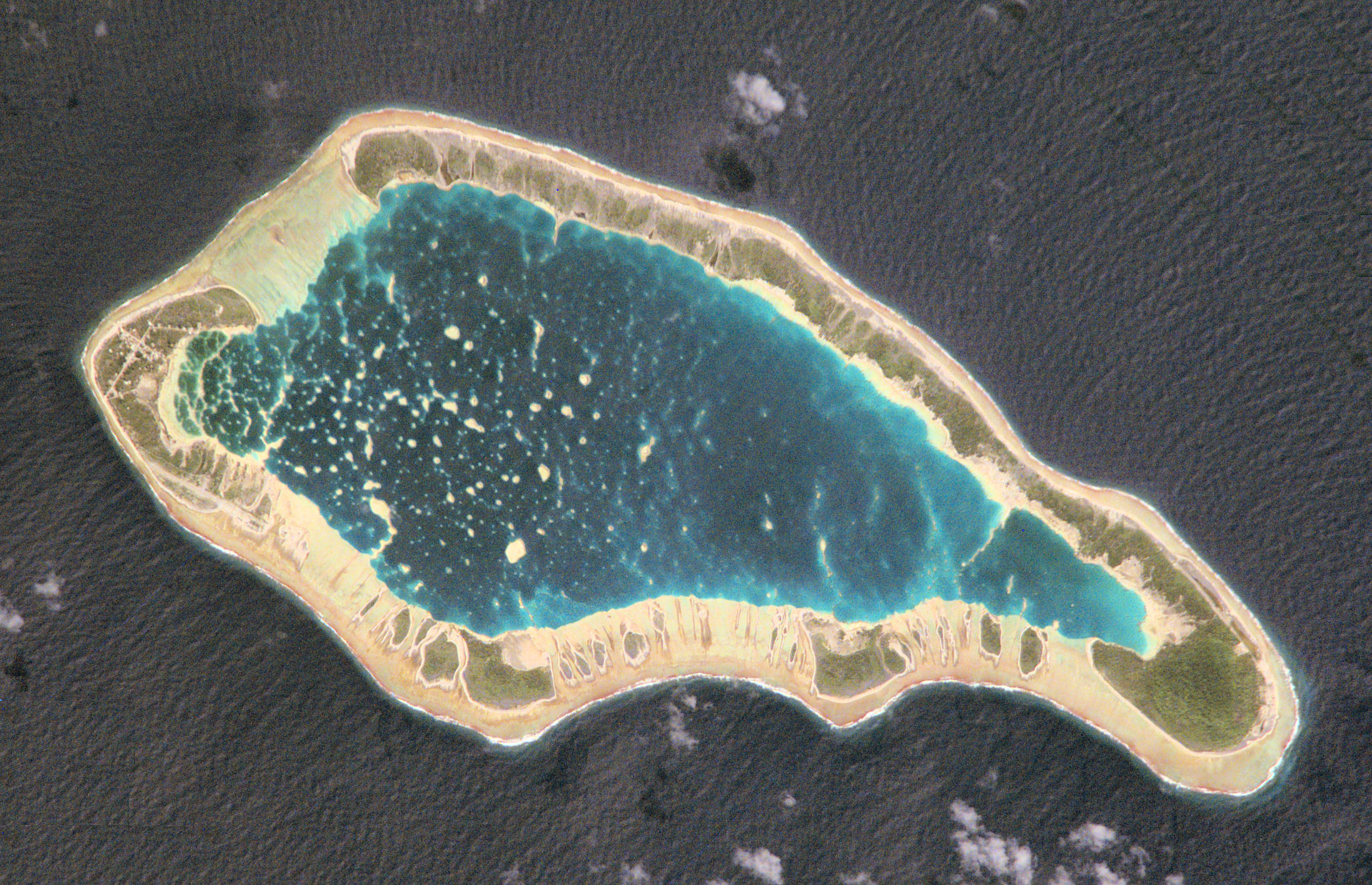
- NASA picture of Napuka Atoll

- Location within French Polynesia

Geography
- Location: Pacific Ocean
- Coordinates: 14°10′12″S 141°13′52″W
- Archipelago: Tuamotus
- Area: 18 km^{2} (6.9 sq mi) (lagoon); 8 km^{2} (3 sq mi) (above water)
- Length: 10.5 km (6.52 mi)
- Width: 4 km (2.5 mi)

Administration
- France
- Overseas collectivity: French Polynesia
- Administrative subdivision: Îles Tuamotu-Gambier
- Commune: Napuka
- Largest settlement: Tepukamaruia

Demographics
- Population: 255 (2022)

Napuka
- Commune
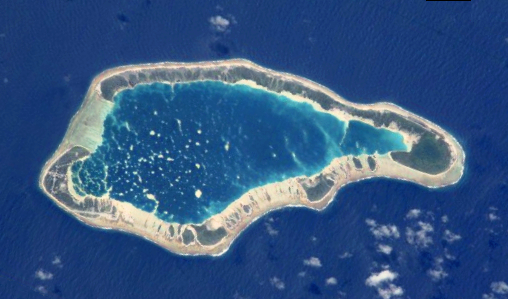

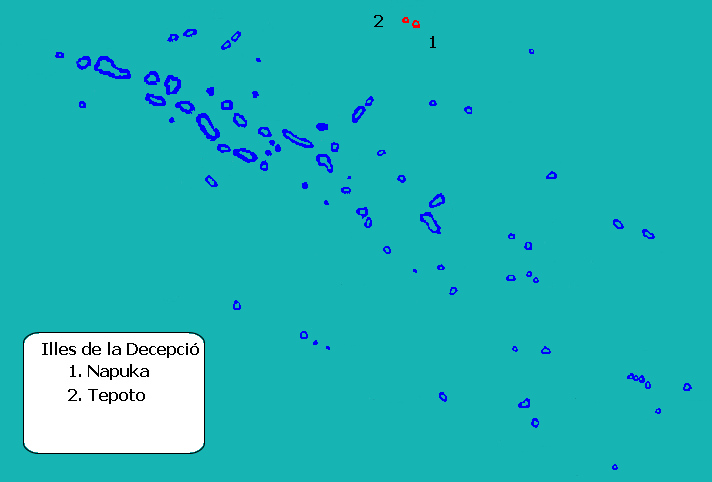
- Location of Napuka
- Coordinates: 14°10′12″S 141°13′52″W
- Country: France
- Overseas collectivity: French Polynesia
- Subdivision: Îles Tuamotu-Gambier
- Area^{1}: 1 km^{2} (0.39 sq mi)
- Elevation: 0 m (0 ft)
- Population (2022): 307
  - Density: 310/km^{2} (800/sq mi)
- Time zone: UTC−10:00
- INSEE/Postal code: 98730 /
- ^{1} French Land Register data, which excludes lakes, ponds, glaciers > 1 km^{2} (0.386 sq mi or 247 acres) and river estuaries.

Napuka, or Pukaroa, is a small coral atoll in the Disappointment Islands, in the northeastern part of the Tuamotu Archipelago in French Polynesia. It is located only 15 km to the southeast of Tepoto Nord, its nearest neighbor, forming a small group. These two atolls are quite isolated, the nearest land being Fangatau Atoll 170 km to the south.

Napuka Atoll is 10.5 km long and about 4 km wide. Its reef is quite broad, completely enclosing the lagoon. The total dry land area of the thirty islands on Napuka's reef is 8 km^{2}. The surface of the lagoon is 18 km^{2}.

Napuka has 255 inhabitants according to the 2022 census. The main village is Tepukamaruia (Te Puka Maru Ia).

== History ==
The first recorded European to reach Napuka Atoll was the British explorer John Byron, in 1765. He named Napuka and Tepoto "Disappointment Islands" because he found the natives to be of a hostile disposition toward him.

Napuka was visited by the historic United States Exploring Expedition, on 23 Aug. 1839. This atoll was probably the one that Charles Wilkes called "Wytoohee" or "Wutoohee".

The airport on Napuka opened in 1977.

== Administration ==
The commune of Napuka consists of the atolls of Napuka and Tepoto Nord.
