= Lucy Ann (1810 ship) =

Lucy Ann(e) was built in Canada early in the 19th century and was brought to Australia in 1827. She was first employed as a trading vessel before purchase by the New South Wales government in 1828. In government service the ship was used to help establish a number of new coastal settlements. She was also used to transport descendants of the Bounty mutineers from Pitcairn Island to Tahiti in 1830.

Sold out of government service in 1831, Lucy Ann served as a trading vessel and support ship for whaling stations in New Zealand. She was then converted into a pelagic whaler. In all, the vessel made 16 whaling voyages from Sydney between 1833 and 1852. One of the crewmen who served aboard, in 1842, was American seaman Herman Melville, who later wrote about his time aboard in his novel Omoo (1847). The vessel was taken to Melbourne in the 1850s, and ended her days there as a storage hulk in the Yarra River.

== Arrival in Australia ==
Her Australian registration papers say Lucy Ann was a brig of 213 tons built at Frederickton, New Brunswick, Canada, in 1817 or 1819. Another source, based on Canadian records, agree the vessel was built at Frederickston, but in 1810, and was initially called the William (236 tons). Yet another source says she was built at St Johns in 1809. What seems beyond dispute is that her length was 87 feet 3 inches, beam 23 feet 10 inches, with 5 feet 3 inches between decks.

Lucy Ann departed London 19 January 1827 under the command of Captain Ranulph Dacre with a general cargo and a few passengers. After calls at Cork and St Jago the vessel arrived Hobart on 22 May. She departed Hobart and arrived Sydney 26 June. After completing several voyages between Sydney and Hobart, Captain Dacre offered the vessel for sale to the New South Wales colonial government in August 1827. The offer was accepted, the government paying £2,200.

== In government service ==
Lucy Ann departed Sydney 23 October 1827 for Western Port, on the coast of Victoria, where the government was attempting to establish a new settlement near present-day Corinella. Aboard were 22 soldiers for the garrison, plus other settlers. The settlement was poorly located and later had to be abandoned. On 12 February 1828 she was despatched from Sydney to Moreton Bay where the government was in the process of creating a new settlement that would eventually become the city of Brisbane.

In November 1828, Lucy Ann departed Sydney for King George's Sound in Western Australia, and Fort Dundas on Melville Island off the northern coast, where two new government settlements were being established. The settlement at Melville Island was beset by problems and had to be abandoned. The colony at King George's Sound, the first in Western Australia, prospered and later became the modern city of Albany.

Lucy Ann departed Sydney, on 26 December 1830, in company with HMS Comet, to take aboard the inhabitants of Pitcairn Island and transfer them to Tahiti. Pitcairn, it was decided, had become too small and crowded for the descendants of the Bounty mutineers and the British government had obtained permission from the Tahitian leadership for their resettlement on Tahiti. A dozen of the 86 islanders died in Tahiti due to their susceptibility to disease. For that reason, and, being homesick, they were returned to Pitcairn five months later.

Lucy Ann was back in Sydney by June 1831 where it was announced she would soon be offered for sale. In September that year she was sold out of government service. Her new owners, who paid £1,200, were the Weller brothers, who were in the process of establishing a trading post and bay whaling station in New Zealand.

== Whaling and trading ==
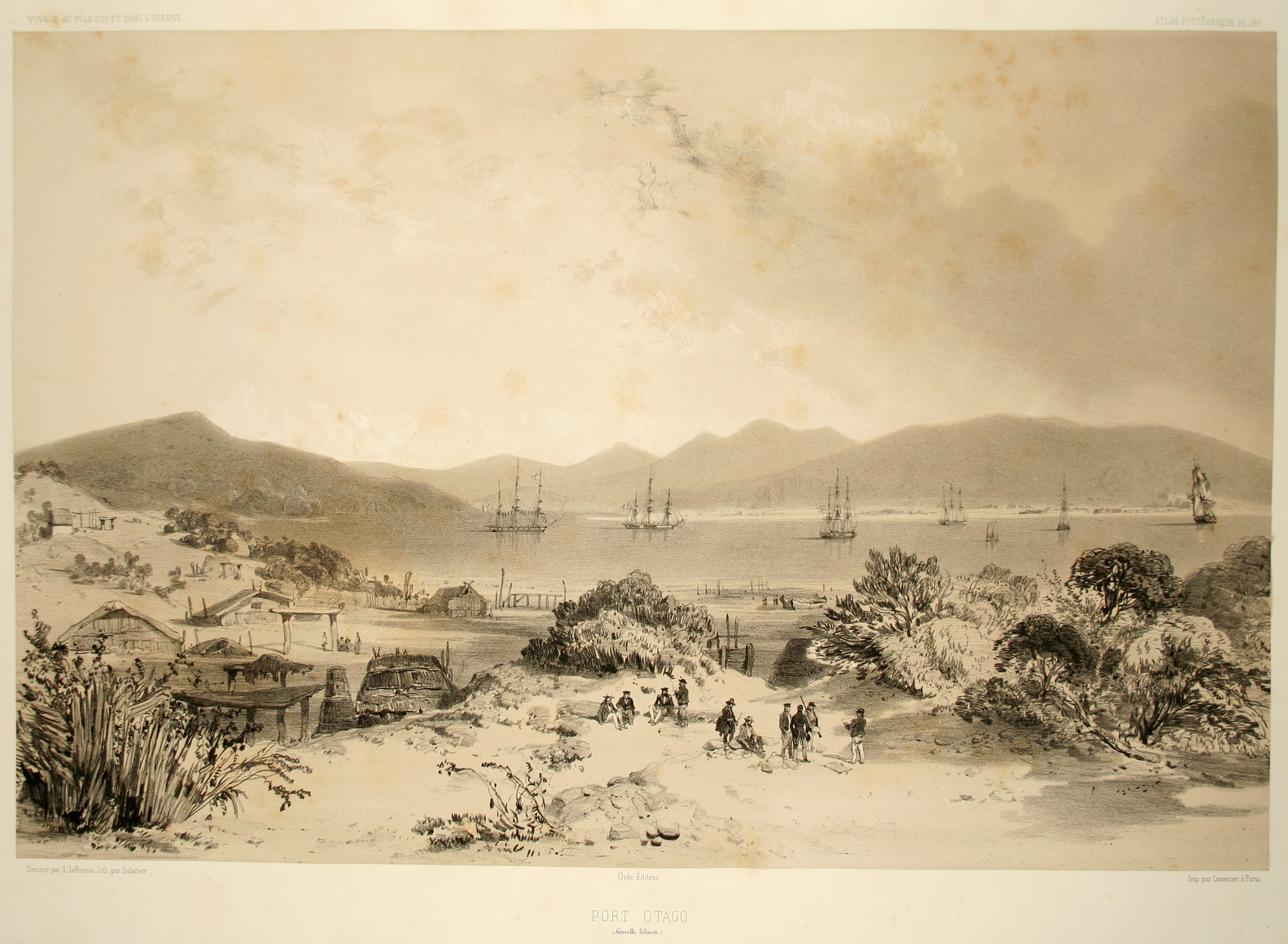
Port Otago in the 1840s

Lucy Ann, under the command of Captain William Owen, left Sydney and arrived at Otago in October with stores and merchandise. This included 6 cases of muskets, 10 barrels and 104 half barrels of gunpowder and assorted whaling equipment. This whaling/trading community became one of the first European settlements in the area. Lucy Ann then went on to the North Island, for a cargo of timber, before returning to Sydney 29 February 1832, in need of repair. While in Sydney Harbour someone tried to burn the vessel. George Weller offered a reward of £50 for apprehension of the culprit.

She departed again for New Zealand in May 1832 with general merchandise, returning early in October with more timber. She left for New Zealand again in mid November, returning in April 1833 with spars and flax. She was by now a regular trader on the trans-Tasman route. She left again for New Zealand in May with a whaling gang, 160 tons of empty oil casks and provisions, returning in November with 130 tuns of right whale oil, flax and 5 Maori passengers. This was reported to be the first oil brought from Otago. December saw her on the route again, returning 26 April 1834. She departed for New Zealand again in May, under Captain Anglin, and returned from Otago in August with whale oil. She departed in January 1835 on the New Zealand run and was back by mid May with more oil. The following month she left again for the Weller brothers for NZ, this time under the command of Captain Samuel Rapsey, and returned in October with oil.

=== Deep-sea whaling ===
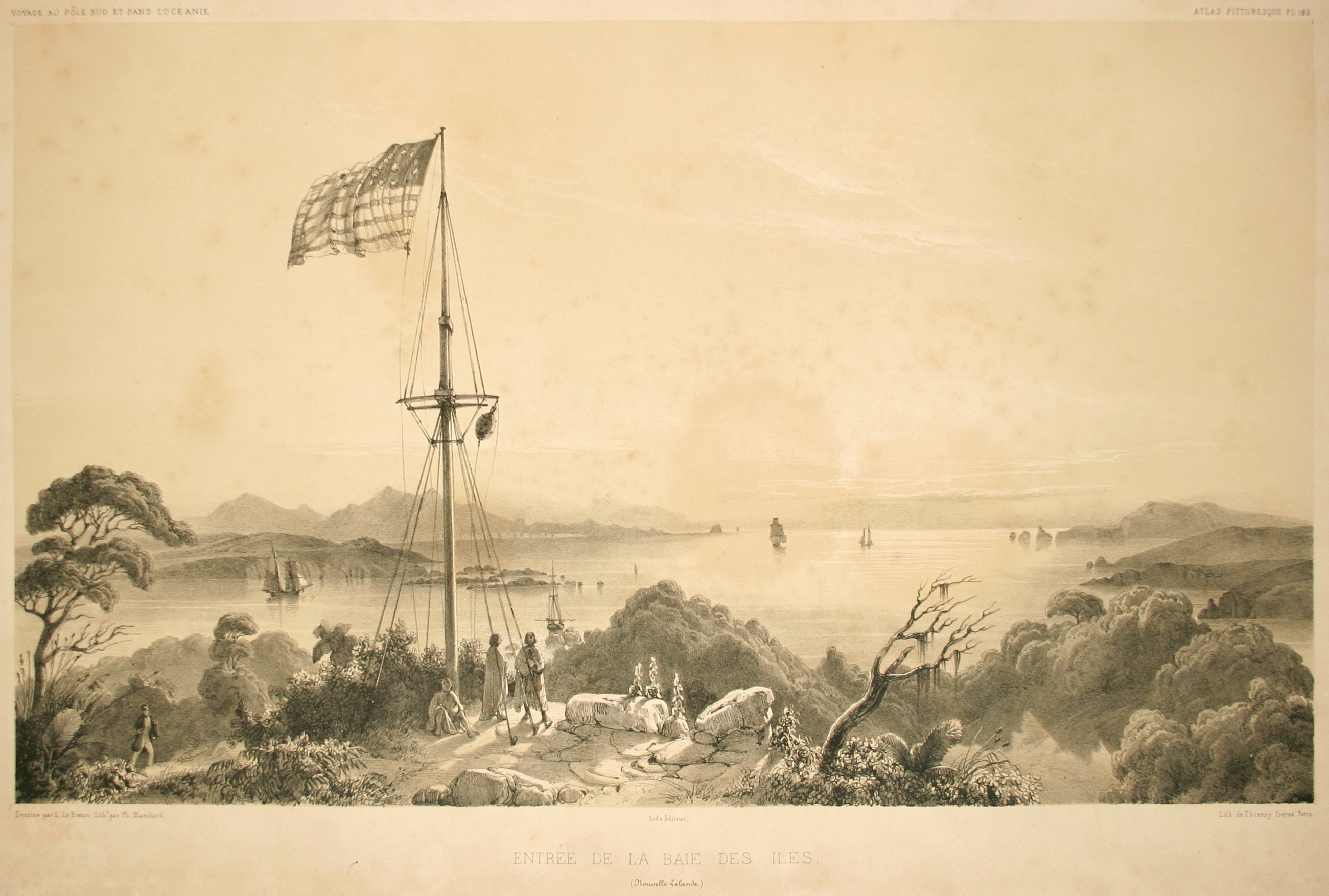
The Bay of Islands c.1840

Late in 1835 the Weller brothers decided to send the vessel sperm whaling. Lucy Ann was modified for pelagic whaling and departed Sydney under the command of Captain Thomas Richards in mid December 1835. The vessel cruised off New Zealand and called several times at the Bay of Islands for food, wood and water. She returned to Sydney on 13 April 1837 with 75 tuns of sperm whale oil.

Her second dedicated whaling voyage, again under Captain Richards, began in mid June 1837 and ended 11 months later when she returned to Sydney having taken 500 barrels of right whale oil and 300 of sperm whale oil. It seems the "black" oil was landed at Otago in October 1837, for transhipment to Sydney, after which she went sperm whaling.

Her third voyage began 8 July 1838 under a new master, Captain Charles Aldrich. The voyage lasted 15 months during which time she was reported among the Solomon Islands and at Tahiti. She visited Lord Howe Island in September just before returning to Port Jackson on 13 October 1839 with a reported 800 barrels of sperm whale oil.

Under Captain Aldrich, she next made a brief three-month voyage, departing 24 November, to New Zealand to collect oil from the Weller brother's whaling establishment at Otago. She returned 10 February 1840 with 700 barrels worth of right whale oil and a 22-man whaling gang and other passengers.

Her fourth pelagic whaling voyage began, under Captain Aldrich, in mid May 1840. She was reported off Woodlark Island late that year and at Port Stephens, in August 1841, in a very leaky state. She returned to Port Jackson 11 August with just 260 barrels of sperm whale oil. Back in Sydney the vessel received considerable repairs and was put up for sale. Her new owners sent her on another whaling voyage, under the command of Henry Ventom.

Lucy Ann departed Sydney 14 February 1842, equipped with four whaleboats, and with a crew of about 30 men. She was at Lord Howe Island late in February and was reported on the equator by late June. On 7 July 1842 she arrived at Santa Christina in the Marquesas Islands for fresh provisions, wood and water. While here nine crewmen deserted and another eight were put in irons for “mutinous conduct.” By 8 August the vessel was at Nuku Hiva in the Marquesas where a more crewmen deserted. A few replacements were found on the island, one of them an American seaman, Herman Melville. Melville would later describe the vessel in his book Omoo as,

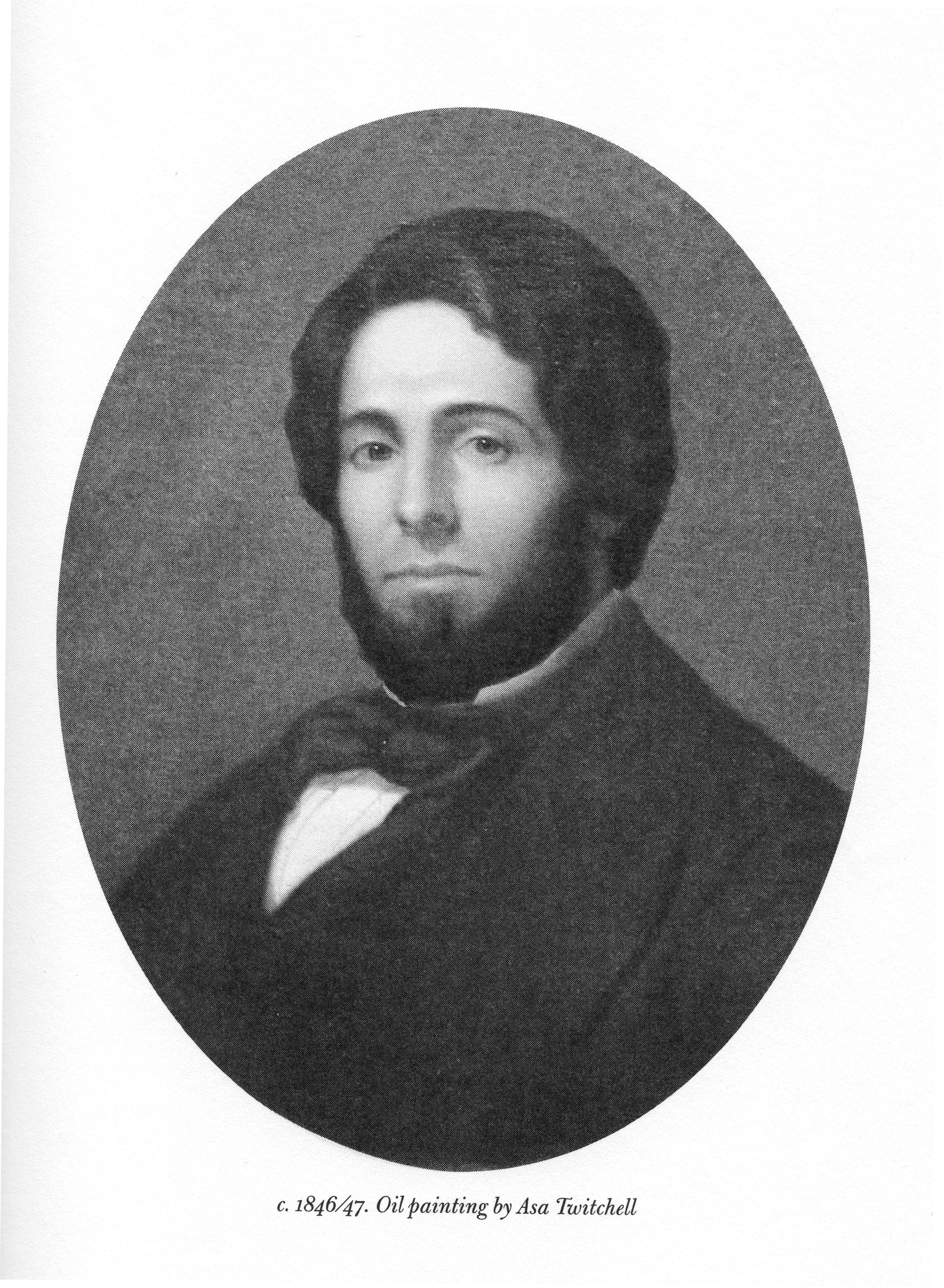
Herman Melville in 1846 or 1847.

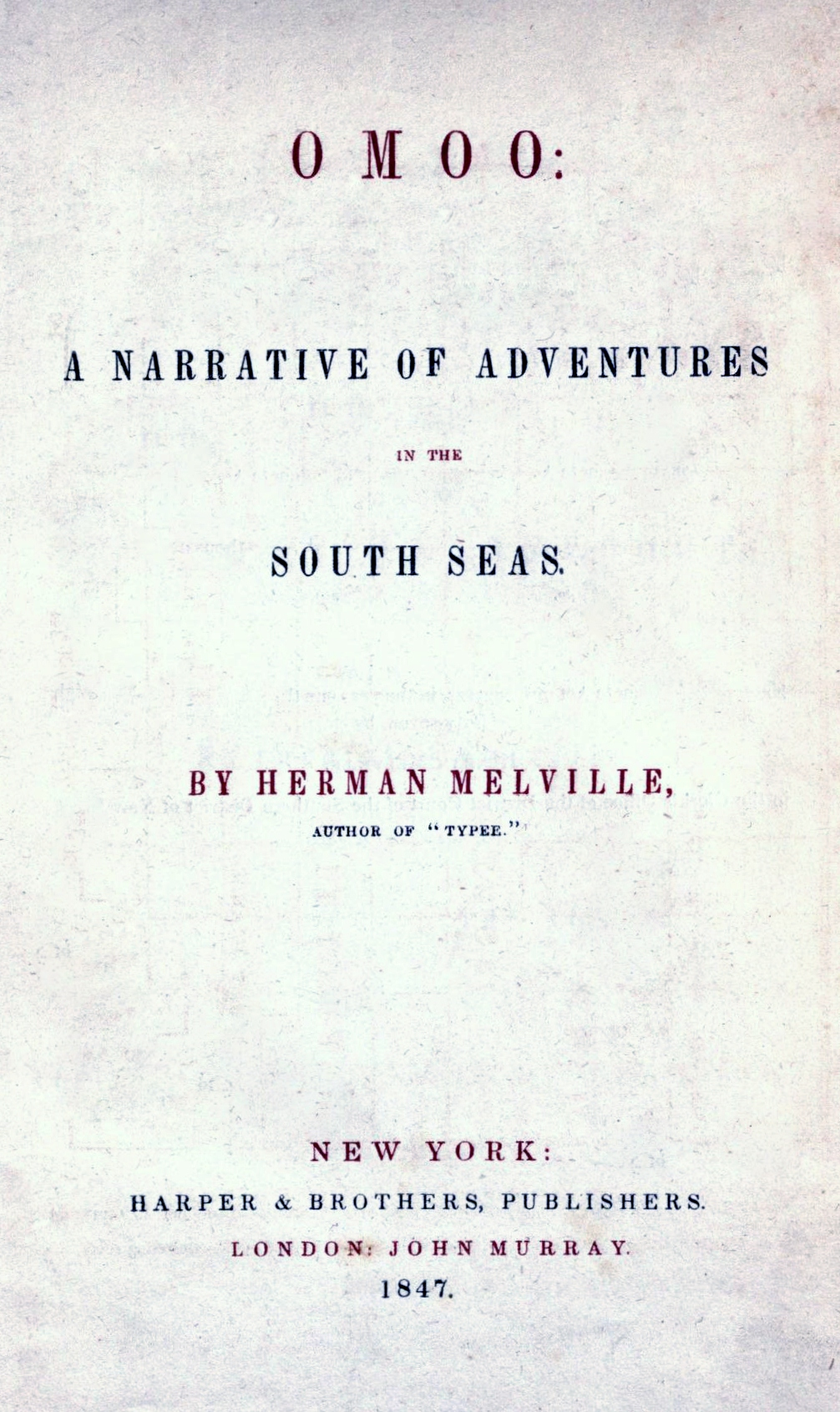
The first edition of Omoo by Herman Melville was published in 1847

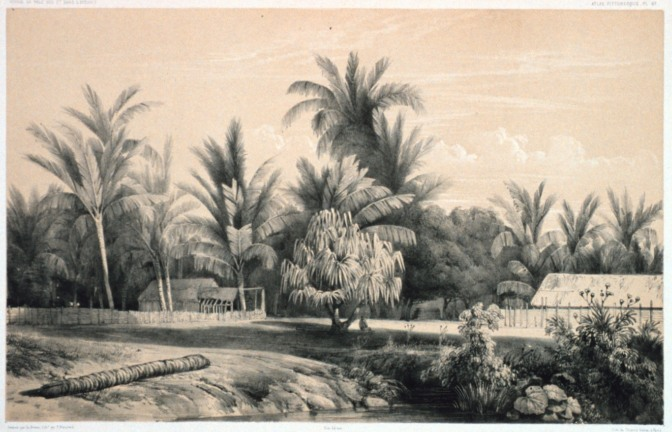
Native houses on Tahiti in 1842.

... a small slatternly looking craft, her hull and spars a dingy black, rigging all slack and bleached nearly white, and every thing denoting an ill state of affairs aboard. The four boats hanging from her sides proclaimed her a whaler ... [she was in] a miserable plight. The lower masts were said to be unsound; the standing rigging was much worn; and, in some places, even the bulwarks were quite rotten ... All over, the ship was in a most dilapidated condition, but in the forecastle it looked like the hollow of an old tree going to decay. In every direction the wood was damp and discoloured, and here and there soft and porus. Moreover, it was hacked and hewed without mercy, the cook frequently helping himself to splinters for kindling-wood from the bitts and beams. Overhead, every carline was sooty, and here and there deep holes were burned in them, a freak of some drunken sailors on a voyage long previous.

The vessel called at Tahiti in September 1842 where eleven crewmen, including Melville, were put ashore for refusing to obey orders. 1843 with just 250 barrels of sperm whale oil. Five men from Cadmus, a whaler that had wrecked in August, joined Lucy Ann. Lucy Ann returned to Sydney on 20 May

Lucy Ann departed on her next voyage 25 June 1843 under the command of Captain Richard Lee. She touched at Norfolk Island in February 1843 and was reported off Lord Howe Island in March. She was at Port Stephens on the coast of New South Wales in May and in August at Port Cooper (Lyttelton) New Zealand. She returned to Sydney 26 September 1844 with 614 barrels of oil. The vessel was purchased in January 1845 by high-profile entrepreneur Benjamin Boyd who again sent her whaling.

Her commander on this voyage was Captain John Long (c1815-1852) and carried a crew of 30 men. She returned 10 months later with 700 barrels of oil. It was reported in the press, "The Lucy Ann has returned to port, owing to the badness of her whaling gear, as no dependance could be placed in either harpoons, lances or spades."

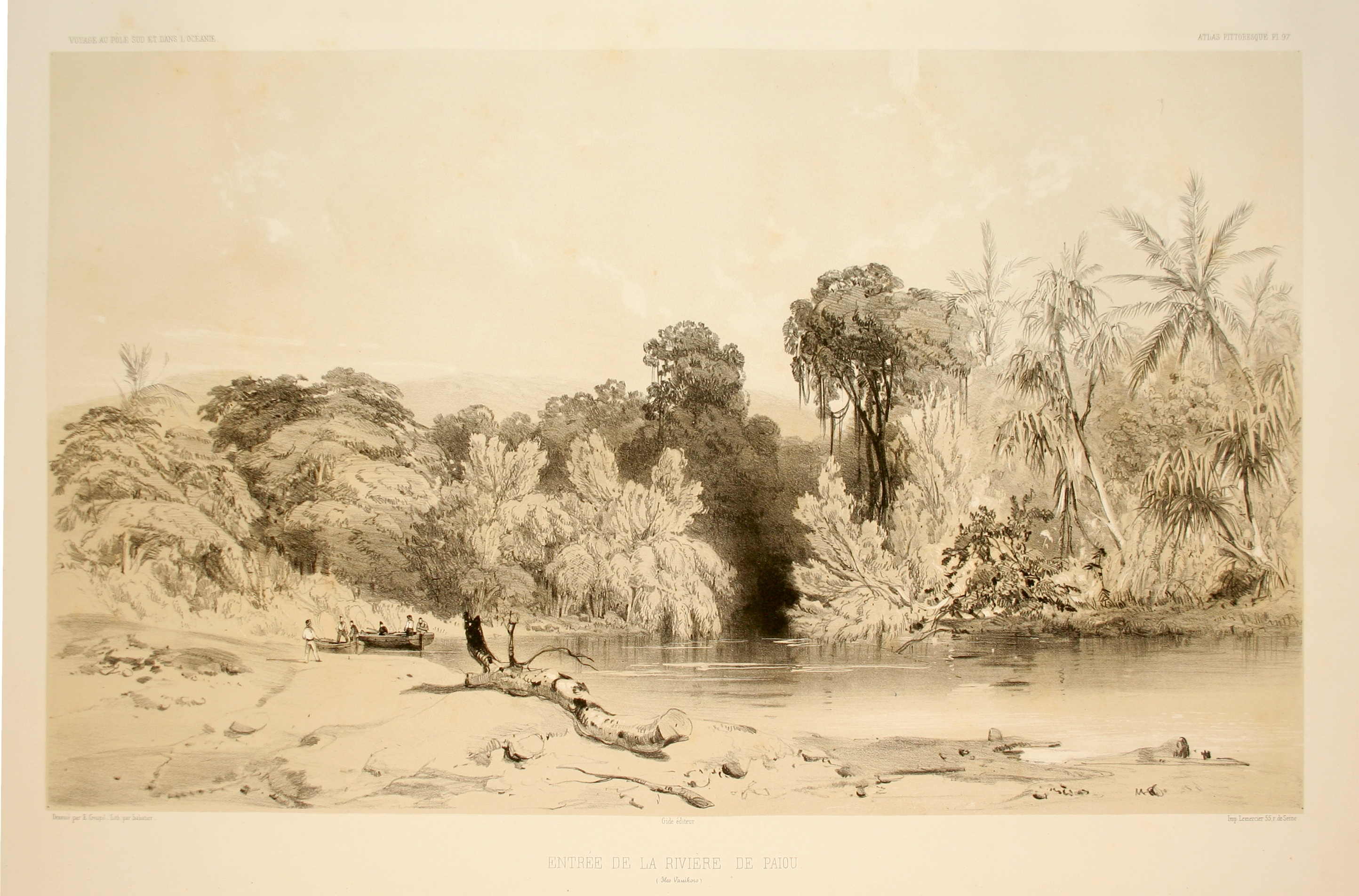
Two boats on a beach in the Solomon Islands in the 1840s.

Her next voyage was under Captain William Barr and was planned to last for two years. They departed Sydney 15 June 1846 and by 23 June were off Booby Shoal in the Coral Sea where they saw the wreck of the Peruvian (304 tons) which had left Sydney 26 February bound for Lima. Early in February 1847 Lucy Ann called at Stewart's Island (Sikaiana) in the Solomon Islands for water and wood. The ship then cruised off New Britain and New Ireland. Captain Barr went aboard the Sydney whaler Terror (Captain Downes) also owned by Benjamin Boyd, and Captain Barr told him of his crew troubles. Many of his crewmen were "twice-convicted convicts" and reported he had discovered and thwarted a plot by some of them to take control of the ship while the boats were away after whales. Captain Downes recorded Captain Barr bored him with his endless whaling stories. Lucy Ann returned to Sydney 28 June, twelve months early, largely due to crew problems and complaints about the food.

The next whaling voyage began 7 September 1847 under the command of Captain William Henry Downes. The vessel was off Wilson’s Promontory on the coast of Victoria in October when Captain Downes boat upset while taking a whale and he was drowned. His body was placed in a cask or rum till return to Sydney for burial. Chief officer William Bearis then took command. The vessel cruised off the Kermadec Islands and was reported at Aneityum and Lord Howe Island before returning to Sydney 29 January 1849 with 300 barrels of sperm whale oil. While at sea the vessel had been sold to William Campbell.

Her next whaling voyage, under the command of Captain William Greig, began on 19 June 1849. By June she was at Rotuma where more crewmen were recruited. She was anchored at Strong's Island on 23 May 1850 when a water cask fell down the main hatch and struck the 2nd mate, Mr Davis. He suffered a fractured skull and died a few hours later and was buried on the island the following day. After 17 months away the vessel returned to Sydney with just 100 barrels of sperm whale oil, 3 tuns of coconut oil and a case of tortoiseshell.

The last whaling voyage began 24 March 1851, under the command of Captain James Lovett. She returned to port just a week later having experiencing a series of gales after which "the crew refused to proceed on the voyage." Replacement crewmen were found and the vessel resumed the cruise on 4 April. By 7 June, Lucy Ann was reported at Samoa where additional crewmen seem to have been recruited. By mid September they were off Nauru and then New Ireland in October. They dropped anchor at Gower’s Harbour on New Ireland on 2 November 1851, where they encountered the schooner Ariel. They told Captain Bradley of that vessel that they had earlier had some kind of violent clash with the natives of New Guinea. Captain Bradley described Lucy Ann as being "well armed and well manned". The vessel experienced a succession of gales prior to her return to Sydney where she arrived on 23 March 1852 with 300 barrels of sperm whale oil and a crew of 25 men.

=== Last years ===
Lucy Ann departed Sydney on 25 May 1852 for Melbourne and arrived 11 June. While in Melbourne she was offered for sale as a store ship. The discovery of rich gold fields in central Victoria the year before had led to the arrival of large numbers of vessels to land cargo and passengers and created an urgent need for storage facilities in Port Phillip Bay. She was bought for use as coal depot by the owners of the steamer Gipsy. In March 1855 she was offered for sale, as a storage hulk, as part of the estate of George A. Mouritz and changed hands again, this time for £85. It is unknown when and where she was finally broken up or sank.
