= Tenarunga =

Atoll in the Acteon Group in French Polynesia

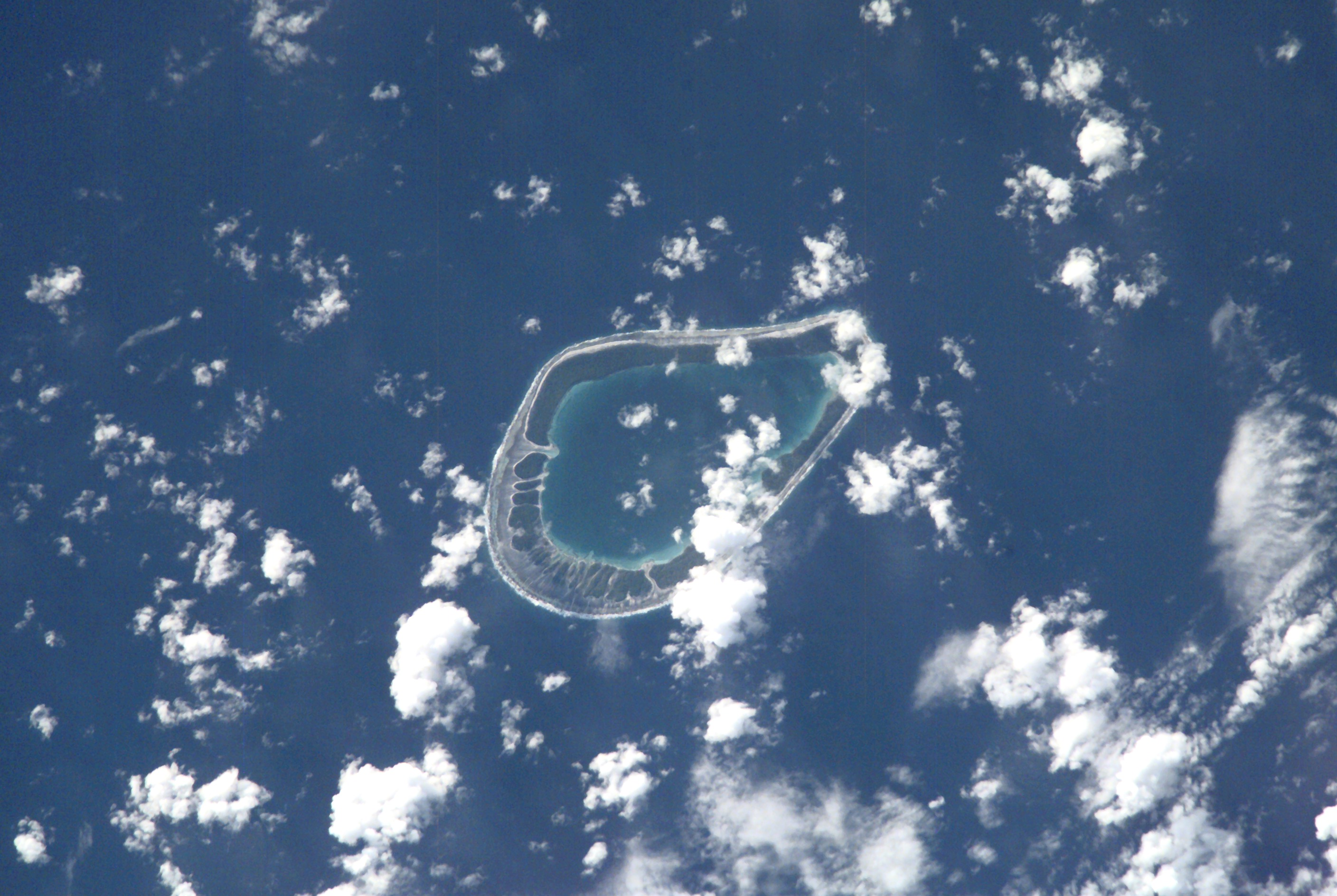
- NASA picture of Tenarunga Atoll

- Location within French Polynesia

Geography
- Location: Pacific Ocean
- Coordinates: 21°19′S 136°32′W
- Archipelago: Tuamotus
- Area: 5 km^{2} (1.9 sq mi) (lagoon); 2.3 km^{2} (0.9 sq mi) (above water)

Administration
- France
- Overseas collectivity: French Polynesia
- Administrative subdivision: Îles Tuamotu-Gambier
- Commune: Gambier

Demographics
- Population: 10-50 (2022)

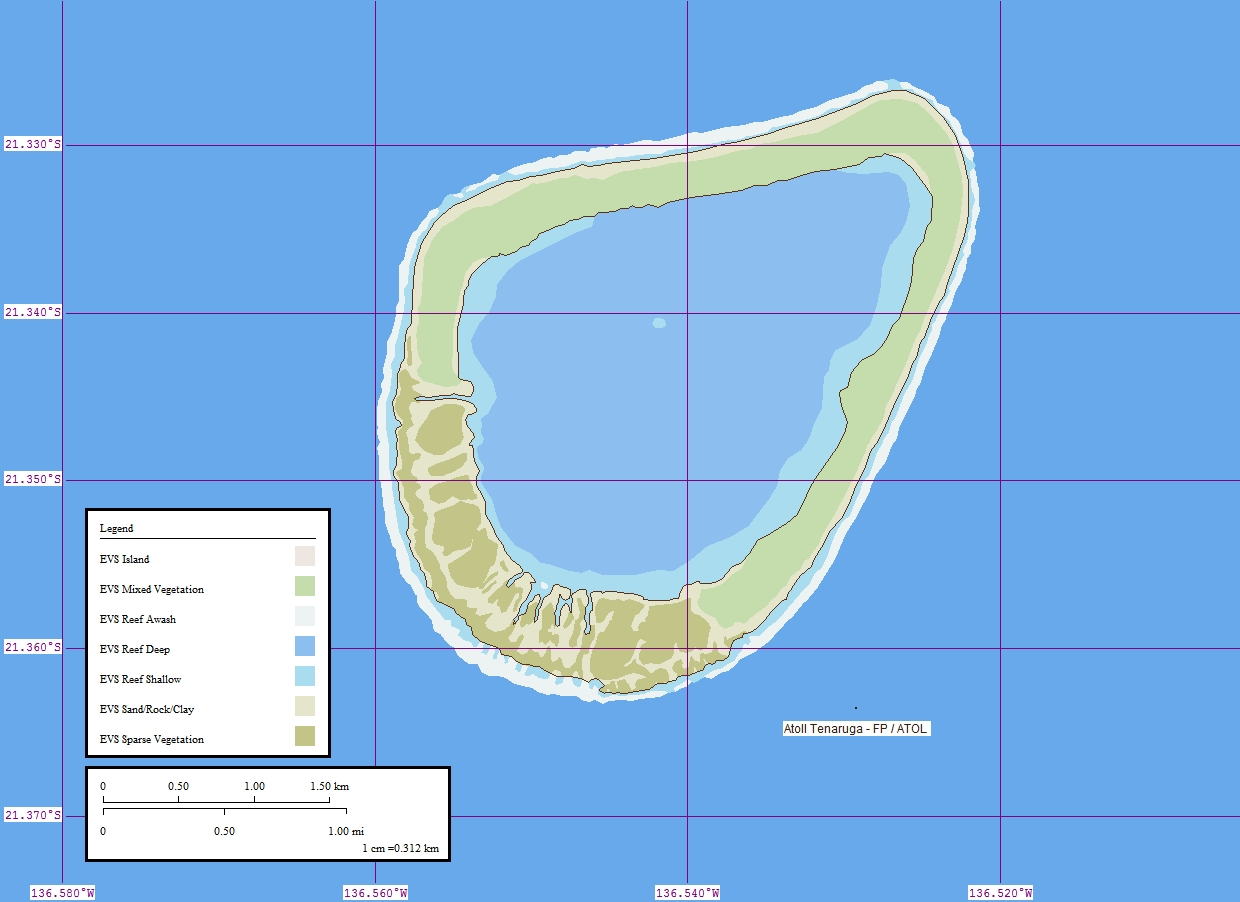
Map of Tenarunga Atoll

Tenarunga or Tenania, previously Narunga and formerly Minto Island, is a low, wooded atoll in the Acteon Group in the southeastern part of the Tuamotu Islands in French Polynesia. It is administratively a part of the Gambier Islands. The atoll has a population of between 10 and 50 people.

== Geography ==
Tenarunga is located 15 kilometres (9 miles) northwest of Matureivavao, 6 kilometres (4 miles) east of Vahanga and 1,375 kilometres (854 miles) southeast of Tahiti. It has a land area of 2.3 square kilometres (0.9 square miles) and a total area (lagoon inclusive) of 5 square kilometres (2 square miles). There are some buildings and a dock located on the north-east side of the island, indicating former and/or seasonal habitation.

The atoll's lagoon is not accessible from the sea.

== History ==
The first recorded sighting of this atoll was made during the Spanish expedition of the Portuguese navigator Pedro Fernández de Quirós on 5 February 1606 under the name Las Cuatro Coronadas (the "four crowned" (by coconut palms)); however, these observations were not fully documented. As such, the first unambiguous approach to the island was made on 14 March 1828 by the collector Hugh Cuming in his ship The Discoverer, captained by Samuel Grimwood. The next visit was in 1833 by the navigator Thomas Ebrill on his merchant's vessel Amphitrite and again in 1837 by Lord Edward Russell, commander of the H.M.S Actaeon, the name given to the group.

== Flora and fauna ==
The island is home to many rare species including the Tuamotu sandpiper.

In 2015 a conservation campaign resulted in the eradication of rats from the island.

== See also ==
- Matureivavao
- Tenararo
- Vahanga
- Acteon Group
- Desert island
- List of islands
