= Tepoto (North) =

Atoll in French Polynesia

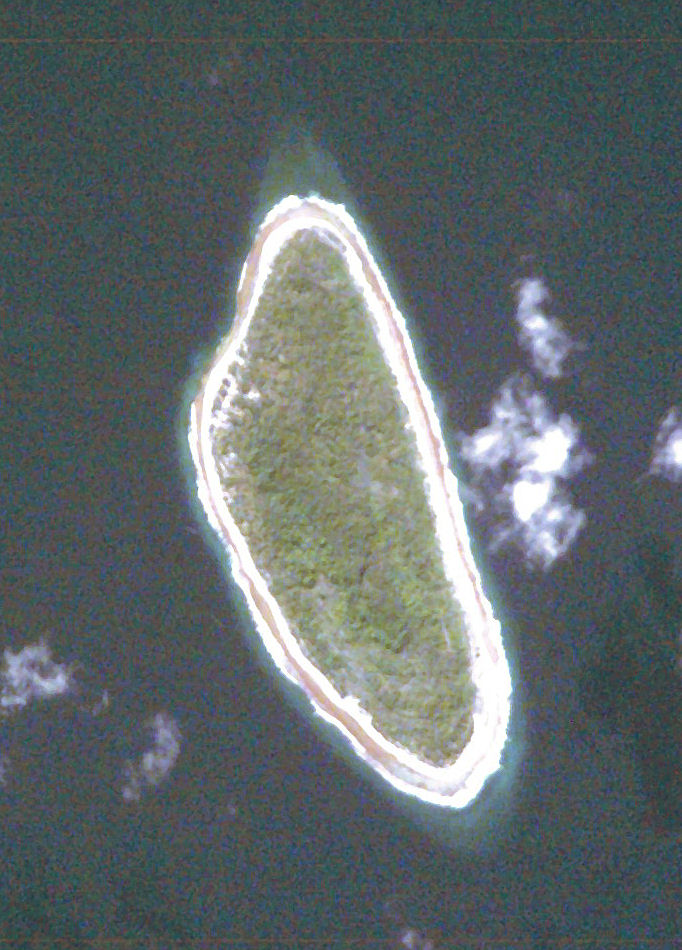
- NASA picture of Tepoto Atoll

- Location within French Polynesia

Geography
- Location: Pacific Ocean
- Coordinates: 14°08′S 141°24′W
- Archipelago: Tuamotus
- Area: 4 km^{2} (1.5 sq mi)
- Length: 2.6 km (1.62 mi)
- Width: 0.8 km (0.5 mi)

Administration
- France
- Overseas collectivity: French Polynesia
- Administrative subdivision: Tuamotus
- Commune: Napuka

Demographics
- Population: 61 (2012); 50 (2026 est.)

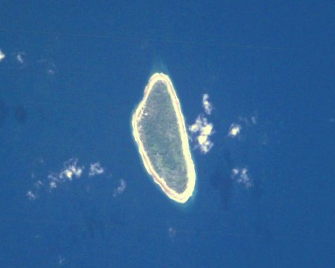
NASA picture of Tepoto Island FP

Tepoto, also known as Tepoto Nord (to avoid confusion with Tepoto Atoll [Tepoto Sud] 400 kilometres [249 miles] to the southwest), Te Poto, Toho, or Pukapoto, is a coral island, the northwesternmost of the Disappointment Islands in the Tuamotu Archipelago in French Polynesia. The closest land is the coral atoll Napuka, which lies 10 miles (16 km) to the east-southeast. Tepoto Nord belongs to the commune of Napuka, which consists of Napuka and Tepoto Nord.

== Description ==
Originally an atoll, Tepoto's lagoon became filled in entirely. It was raised about 65 feet (20 m) above sea level, "possibly by some volcanic upheaval".

Tepoto is 2.6 kilometres (1.6 mi) long and 0.8 kilometres (0.50 mi) wide, oriented north-west to south-east; it has an area of 4 square kilometres (2 sq mi).

There is a 5 m (16 ft)-wide road running around the island.

== Population ==
The population as of 2026 is estimated to be 54. There was a significant decline from around 1978 (82) to 2007 (44), but the trend has been unevenly upward since then.

In 2018, the first tourist to arrive in at least two decades was told that there were about 40 residents, 13 of whom were children under the age of 12.

The primary village is Tehekega.

== History ==
On 7 June 1765, Royal Navy officer John Byron (Lord Byron's grandfather) became the first European to find the islands. He saw hostile natives brandishing spears on Tepoto and no safe anchorages on either Tepoto or Napuka, so he sailed away without going ashore and named them the "Disappointment Islands".

== Invasive plants ==
Invasive or potentially invasive plants include:

- Achyranthes aspera
- Cenchrus echinatus
- Dioscorea bulbifera
- Ipomoea batatas (sweet potato)
- Nicotiana tabacum
- Paspalum vaginatum
- Tribulus cistoides
