= Puka-Puka =

Atoll in French Polynesia

Puka Puka
- Commune
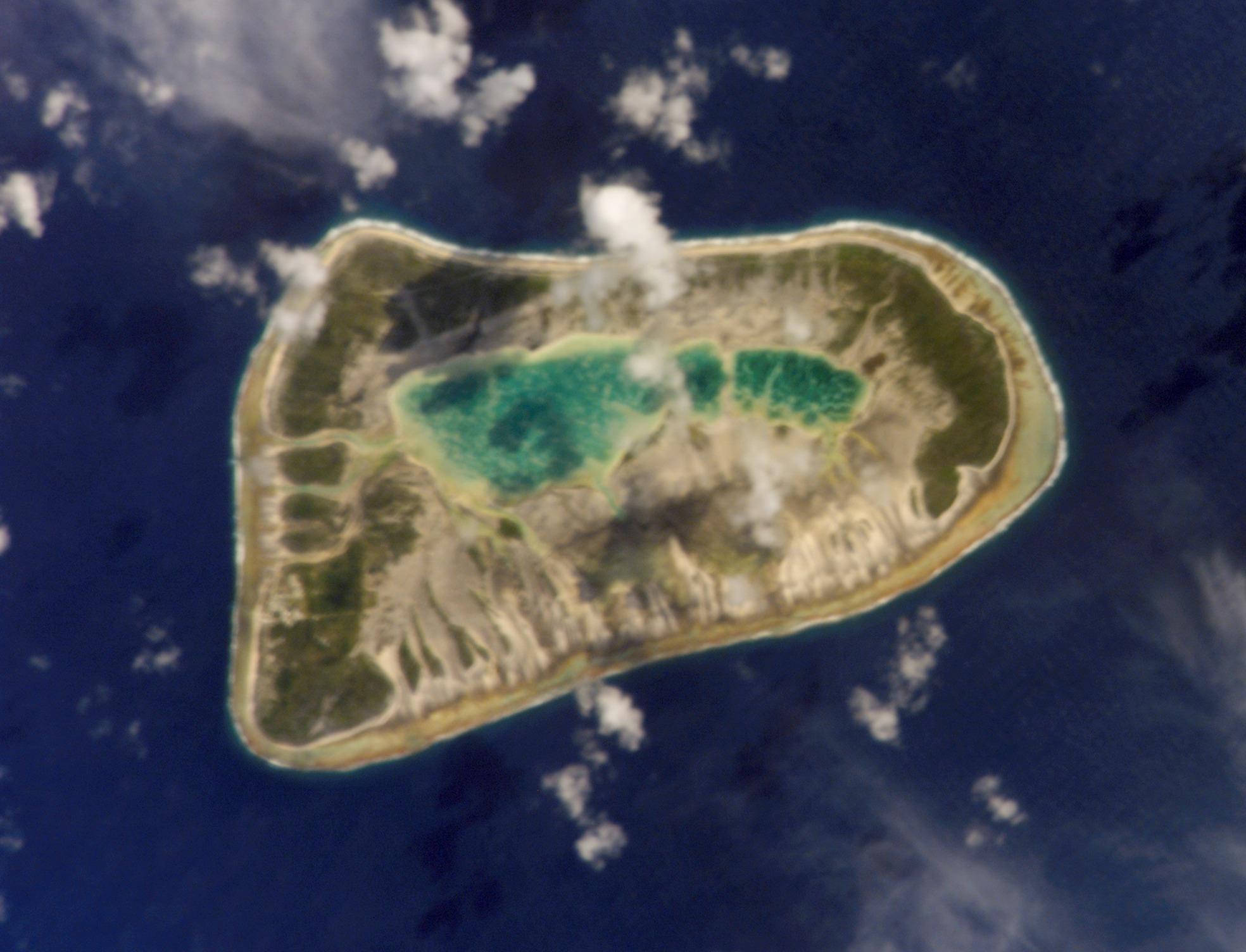
- NASA picture of Puka-Puka Atoll

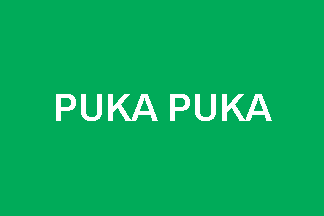
- Flag

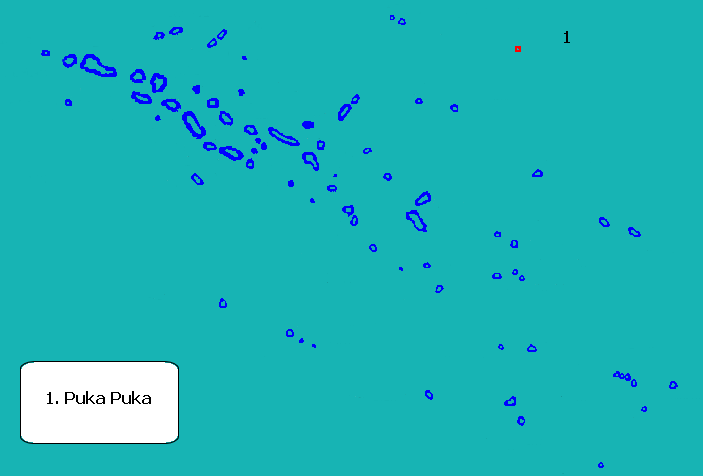
- Location (in red) within the Tuamotu Archipelago
- Location of Puka Puka
- Coordinates: 14°49′S 138°49′W
- Country: France
- Overseas collectivity: French Polynesia
- Subdivision: Îles Tuamotu-Gambier

Government
  - Mayor (2020–2026): Raphaël Villant
- Area^{1}: 5 km^{2} (1.9 sq mi)
- Elevation: 0 m (0 ft)
- Population (2022): 137
  - Density: 27/km^{2} (71/sq mi)
- Time zone: UTC−10:00
- INSEE/Postal code: 98737 /
- ^{1} French Land Register data, which excludes lakes, ponds, glaciers > 1 km^{2} (0.386 sq mi or 247 acres) and river estuaries.

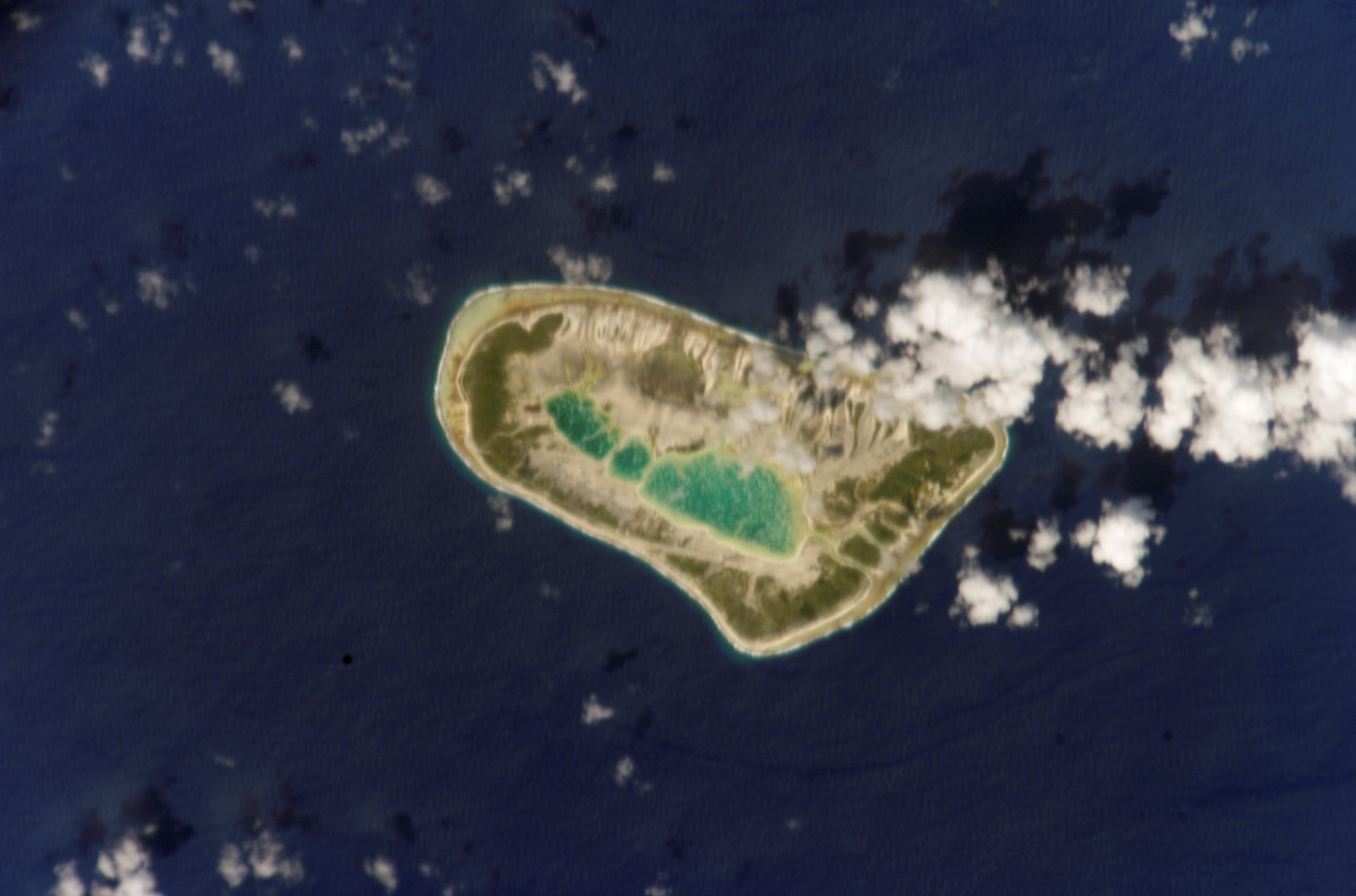
Another NASA picture of Puka-Puka

Puka-Puka is a small inhabited coral atoll in the north-eastern Tuamotu Archipelago, sometimes included as a member of the Disappointment Islands. This atoll is quite isolated, the nearest land being Fakahina, 182 km to the southwest.

Puka-Puka Atoll has an elliptical shape. Its length is 6 km and its maximum width 3.3 km. Its land area is about 5 km^{2}. The lagoon is filled with silt and has become very small.

The low coral islands are dry and sparsely populated. According to the 2022 census, the total population was 137. The chief town is Te One Mahina, with about 110 inhabitants.

Unlike the rest of the Tuamotus, the language of the islands, Pukapukan, is Marquesic.

== History ==
Puka-Puka was the first of the Tuamotus sighted by the Spanish expedition of Ferdinand Magellan on 21 January 1521, and charted as San Pablo because it was discovered on the day on which Paul of Tarsus is traditionally said to have become a Christian. Together with Flint Island (named Tiburones) they were named Islas Infortunadas (Unfortunate Islands in Spanish).

Dutch explorers Jacob le Maire and Willem Schouten arrived at Puka-Puka on April 10, 1616, during their Pacific journey. They called this atoll "Honden Eiland" ("Dog Island").

On 30 July 1947, Thor Heyerdahl and his six-man expedition aboard the raft Kon Tiki made their first sighting of land since departing Callao, Peru when they passed by Puka-Puka.

The islands were devastated by a typhoon in 1996. However, with French assistance, Te One Mahina has been rebuilt.

Puka-Puka Airport was inaugurated in 1979.

== Administration ==
Puka-Puka is the name of the administrative commune in which it lies, of which it is the sole atoll. The seat of the commune is the village Teone-Mahina.

== See also ==
- List of reduplicated place names
