= Robert Wan =

Robert Wan, also known as Wan Fui Yin (born 1934) is a French Polynesian pearl trader. Due to his importance to French Polynesia's pearl industry, he is known as the "emperor of pearls". He particularly invested in the Gambier Islands, to produce black pearls that garnered international attention. Over the years, he expanded his holdings, acquiring farms on islands such as Marutea Sud and Nengonengo.

Wan was born in Papeete. His father was a Hakka from Guangdong who emigrated to Tahiti. In July 1973 he purchased the Tahiti Pearls company with his brothers. Their first harvest was purchased by Mikimoto in 1977. In 1982 he purchased Anuanuraro, then Marutea Sud in 1984, Aukena in 1988, and Nengonengo in 1990. In 1996, he was appointed Chevalier of the French National Order of Merit, and in 2000 he was awarded the rank of Chevalier of the Legion of Honour. He became the richest man in French Polynesia, until a collapse in the pearl market in 1998.

In 2002 he sold Anuanuraro to the French Polynesian government. The sale sparked a criminal probe for misuse of public funds, and Wan and a number of leading politicians, including former president Gaston Flosse, were charged with corruption. Wan and Flosse were finally acquitted in July 2017.
