= Disappointment Islands =

Archipelago in French Polynesia

Coordinates: 14°10′S 141°16′W

Location of the Disappointment Islands in the Pacific Ocean

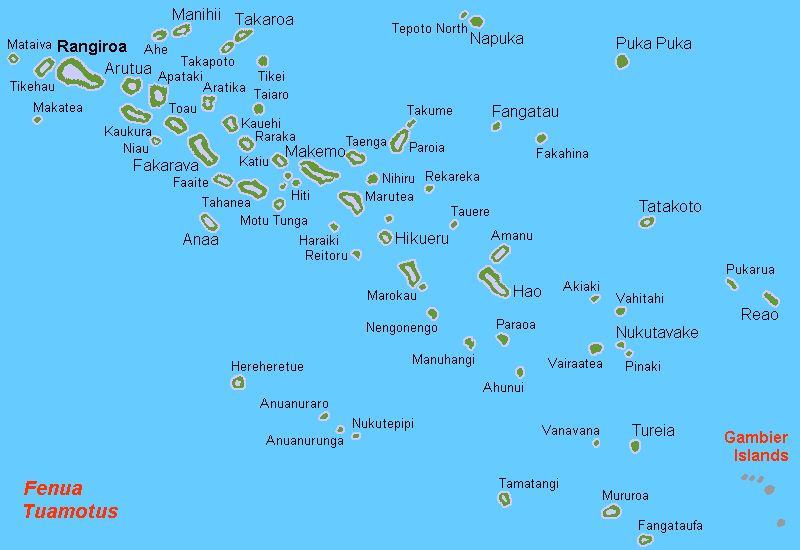
The Disappointment Islands are located towards the northeastern expanses of the Tuamotus.

The Disappointment Islands (French: Îles du Désappointement [il dy dezapwɛ̃tmɑ̃]) are a subgroup of the Tuamotu Archipelago in French Polynesia. They are located towards the northeast, away from the main Tuamotu group.

The Disappointment Islands are a small group of coral islands, which includes the island of Tepoto and the atoll of Napuka. Puka-Puka, 290 kilometres (180 mi) to their southeast, is often included in this subgroup.

These islands are arid, and are not especially conducive to human habitation.

== Demographics ==
The Disappointment Islands are sparsely populated. The inhabitants are overwhelmingly native Polynesians. According to the 2002 census, the population of the islands is as follows:

- Tepoto: 54
- Napuka: 257
- Puka-Puka: 197

== Administration ==
Administratively Tepoto Island belongs to the commune of Napuka, while Puka-Puka has its own commune.

== History ==
The western Disappointment Islands, Tepoto and Napuka, were colonized by voyagers from the neighboring Tuamotus, but Puka-Puka was colonized by settlers from the Marquesas Islands, several hundred kilometres to the northeast. On 7 June 1765, Royal Navy officer John Byron (Lord Byron's grandfather) became the first European to find the islands. He first saw hostile natives brandishing spears on Tepoto and no safe anchorages on either Tepoto or Napuka, so he sailed away without going ashore and named them the "Disappointment Islands". The islands were also visited by the United States Exploring Expedition in 1839.
