= Acteon Group =

Uninhabited island group in French Polynesia

Coordinates: 21.383°S 136.583°W

Acteon Islands
Native name: Îles Acteon

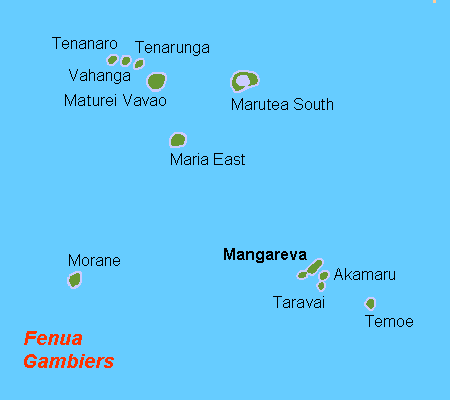
- The Acteon Group northwest of the Gambier Islands

Geography
- Location: Pacific Ocean
- Archipelago: Polynesia
- Total islands: 4
- Major islands: Tenarunga, Vahanga
- Area: 13.46 km^{2} (5.20 sq mi)

Administration
- France
- Overseas collectivity: French Polynesia

Demographics
- Population: 0

Location of the Acteon Group in the Pacific Ocean

The Acteon Group (Groupe Actéon) is a rather isolated and uninhabited subgroup in the far southeast of the Tuamotu atoll group in French Polynesia. It is located about 1,400 km (870 mi) east-southeast of Tahiti at latitude: 21° 17' 60 S, longitude: 136° 29' W.

== Atolls ==
The Acteon Group includes four atolls of relatively small size:

- Matureivavao
- Tenararo
- Tenarunga
- Vahanga

Only Tenarunga has permanent inhabitants.

== History ==
The first recorded European to sight the Acteon Group was Pedro Fernández de Quirós on 5 February 1605. He described the group as "four atolls crowned by coconut palms". On the different texts describing his voyage by other members of this Spanish expedition they were charted as "Las Cuatro Coronadas" (The four Crowned), "Las Cuatro Hermanas" (The Four Sisters), "Las Virgenes" (The Virgins) or "Las Anegadas" (The Flooded ones).

The rediscovery of Acteon Group is generally credited to Thomas Ebrill, captain of the Tahitian trading vessel Amphitrite, who discovered these islands in 1833. However, they were sighted by Hugh Cuming on his ship Discoverer, Captain Samuel Grimwood, on 14 March 1828 [Source: Cuming's log]. They were named four years later by Lord Edward Russell, commander of HMS Actaeon, after his vessel.

In January 1983 these atolls were struck by Severe Tropical Cyclone Nano.

In 1932 Tahiti's High Court recognised government ownership of the group, as well as the nearby atolls of Maria Est, Tematangi, and Vanavana. In 1953 the government established two civil real estate companies to develop the atolls for the benefit of their former inhabitants and granted them exclusive use for ten years. This period of exclusive use was later extended, and in 1975 and 1979 the atolls were permanently transferred. The companies were later dissolved, leaving the ownership of the atolls uncertain.

In March 2021 the Catholic Mission of Tahiti (CAMICA) claimed ownership of the seven atolls by right of occupation, leading to protests by the descendants of the original owners. The acquisition was later challenged in court. In January 2023 two people, including former vicar of the Roman Catholic Archdiocese of Papeete Father Joel Aumeran, were taken into custody and accused of fraud by prosecutors in relation to the case. As of January 2024 the case is still unresolved.

== Administration ==
Administratively, the four atolls of the Acteon group belong to the commune of Gambier.
