= Maria Est =

Atoll in French Polynesia

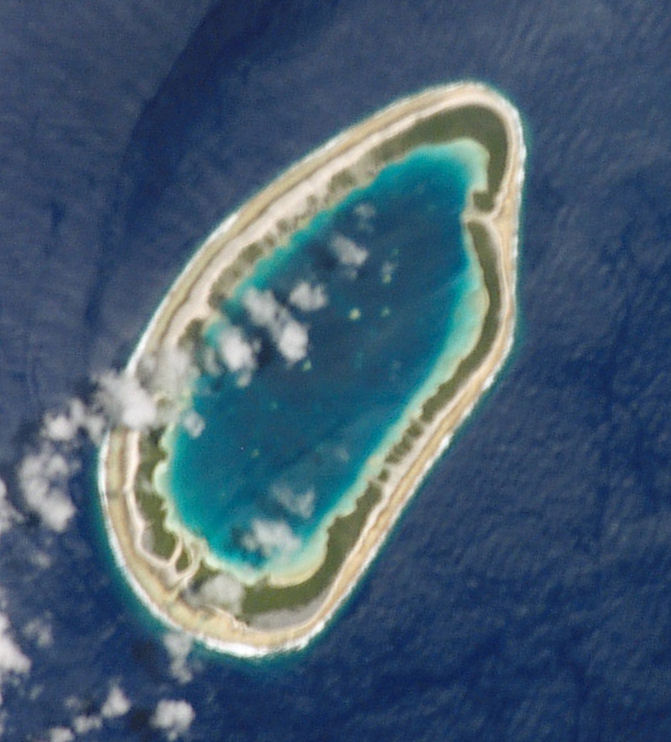
- NASA picture of Maria Est Atoll

- Location within French Polynesia

Geography
- Location: Pacific Ocean
- Coordinates: 22°01′S 136°11′W
- Archipelago: Tuamotus
- Area: 7 km^{2} (2.7 sq mi) (lagoon); 3.75 km^{2} (1 sq mi) (above water)
- Length: 5.6 km (3.48 mi)
- Width: 2.9 km (1.8 mi)

Administration
- France
- Overseas collectivity: French Polynesia
- Administrative subdivision: Îles Tuamotu-Gambier
- Commune: Gambier

Demographics
- Population: Uninhabited (2012)

Maria Atoll is an uninhabited small atoll of the Tuamotu group in French Polynesia. It is located in the far southeast of the archipelago, about 72 km (45 mi) southwest from Marutea Sud. Maria's closest neighbour is the small atoll of Matureivavao of the Acteon Group, 56 km (35 mi) to the northwest.

Maria Atoll is oval in shape and bound by a continuous reef. It is 5.6 km long and 2.9 km wide. Its islands are low and flat and the lagoon is hypersaline.

This atoll is mostly called "Maria Est" in order to avoid confusion with another small atoll called Maria (Nororotu) in the Tubuai (Austral Islands) division of French Polynesia.

== History ==
The first recorded European who arrived at Maria Est was Jacques-Antoine Moerenhout in 1829. On some maps, Maria Atoll appeared as "Moerenhout Island".

== Administration ==
Administratively, Maria Est belongs to the commune of the Gambier Islands.
