= Matureivavao =

Uninhabited atoll in the Tuamotu Islands

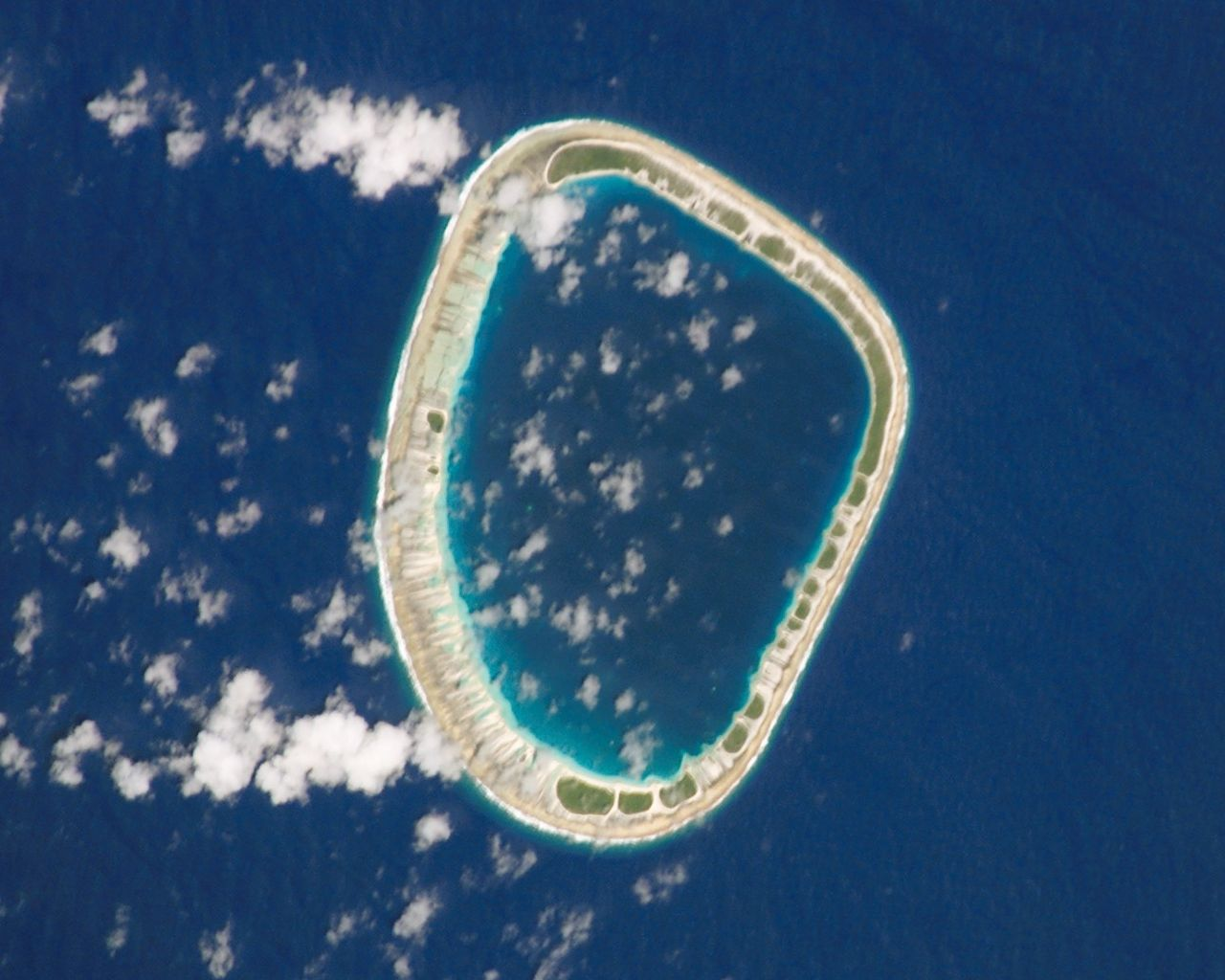
- NASA picture of Matureivavao Atoll

- Location within French Polynesia

Geography
- Location: Pacific Ocean
- Coordinates: 21°29′S 136°25′W
- Archipelago: Tuamotus
- Area: 18 km^{2} (6.9 sq mi) (lagoon); 2.5 km^{2} (1 sq mi) (above water)
- Length: 6.6 km (4.1 mi)
- Width: 4.6 km (2.86 mi)

Administration
- France
- Overseas collectivity: French Polynesia
- Administrative subdivision: Îles Tuamotu-Gambier
- Commune: Gambier

Demographics
- Population: Uninhabited (2012)

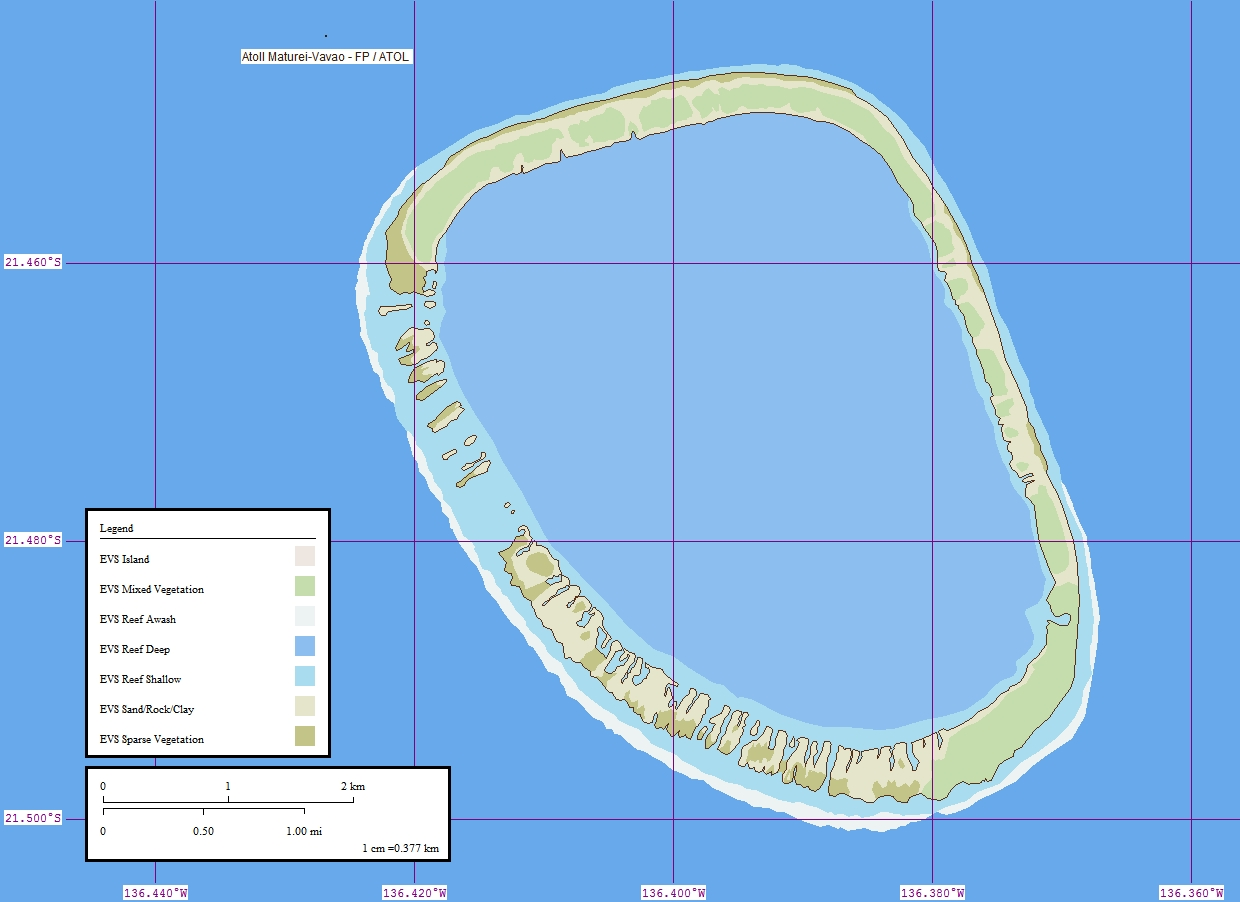
Map of Matureivavao Atoll.

Matureivavao, or Maturei-vavao is an uninhabited atoll in the Acteon Group in the southeastern part of the Tuamotu Islands. It is the largest atoll within the Acteon Group, and like others in this group, is administratively part of the commune of the Gambier Islands.

== Geography ==
Matureivavao is about 6.6 km (4.1 mi) long in a NNW-SSE direction and 4.6 km (2.9 mi) wide. It has a land area of 2.5 km^{2} (1.0 mi^{2}) and a lagoon area of 18 km^{2} (6.9 mi^{2}). It lies 16 km (10 mi) southeast of Tenarunga and 1,390 km (860 mi) from Tahiti. The atoll is high enough to be visible from a considerable distance. It appears as a sandy beach, backed by a line of dark green. In bad weather, the seas sometimes sweep over the reef. There is no entrance to the lagoon.

In some maps, this atoll also appears as "Melbourne".

== History ==
The first recorded sighting of this atoll was made during the Spanish expedition of the Portuguese navigator Pedro Fernández de Quirós on 5 February 1606 under the name Las Cuatro Coronadas (the "four crowned" (by coconut palms)), however, these observations were not fully documented. As such, the first unambiguous approach to the island was made on 14 March 1828 by the explorer Hugh Cuming in his ship Discoverer captained by Samuel Grimwood. The next sighting was in 1833 by navigator Thomas Ebrill on his merchant vessel Amphitrite and again in 1837 by Lord Edward Russell, commander of HMS Actaeon, the name given to the group. It was previously owned by a man named Captain Nicholas but was redeemed in 1934.

== Flora and fauna ==
After the hurricane in 1983, Matureivavao was entirely replanted with thousands of coconut trees. The atoll is also colonized by the invasive Amaranthaceae Achyranthes aspera var. velutina. It is also one of the few atolls in which rats were never introduced.

== See also ==
- Tenararo
- Tenarunga
- Vahanga
- Acteon Group
- Desert island
- List of islands
