= Marutea Sud =

Atoll in French Polynesia

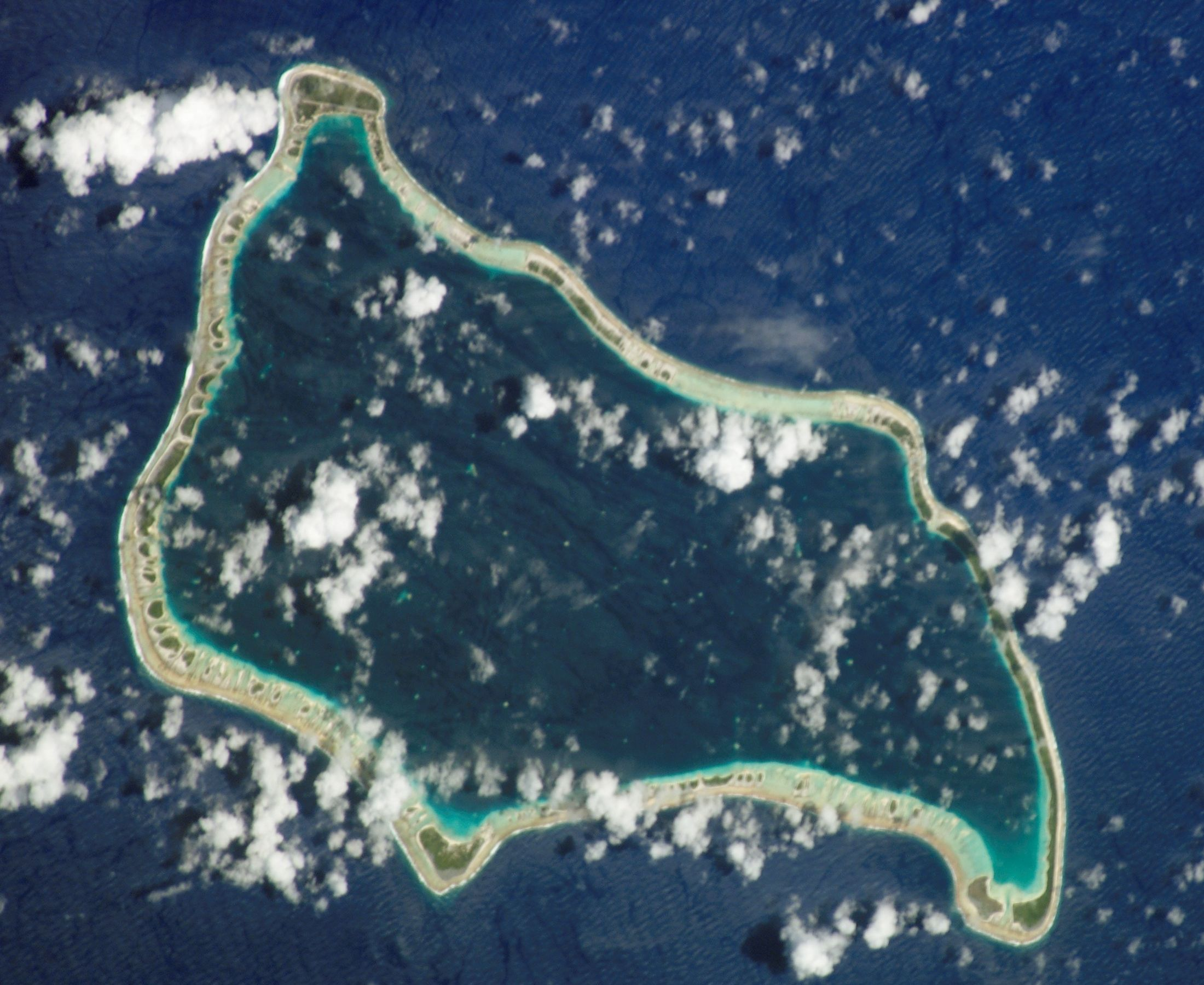
- NASA picture of Marutea Sud Atoll

- Location within French Polynesia

Geography
- Location: Pacific Ocean
- Coordinates: 21°31′S 135°33′W
- Archipelago: Tuamotus
- Area: 112 km^{2} (43 sq mi) (lagoon); 12 km^{2} (4.6 sq mi) (above water)
- Length: 20 km (12 mi)
- Width: 8 km (5 mi)

Administration
- France
- Overseas collectivity: French Polynesia
- Administrative subdivision: Îles Tuamotu-Gambier
- Commune: Gambier
- Largest settlement: Auorotini

Demographics
- Population: 245 (2016)

Marutea Atoll (Marutea Sud), also known as Lord Hood Island, Marutea-i-runga, and Nuku-nui, is an atoll in the far southeast of the Tuamotu group of French Polynesia. It lies in the east-northeast part of the Gambier (commune), about 72 km northeast from Maria Atoll.

Marutea Atoll is irregular in shape and bound by a reef broken by passes into the 112 km^{2} (43 sq mi) lagoon. It is 20 km (12 mi) long with a maximum width of 8 km (5 mi) and a land area of approximately 12 km^{2} (5 sq mi). Its islands are low and flat and the main village, Auorotini, is located at the northern end of the atoll. It is populated by ex Gambier Islanders looking for pearls and maintaining the pearl farms on the atoll.

Marutea Sud should not be confused with Marutea Nord located in the western area of the Tuamotu Archipelago at 17˚ 07' S, 143˚ 11' W.

== History ==
The first recorded European to sight this atoll was Spanish explorer Pedro Fernández de Quirós on 4 February 1606. He called it San Telmo. Other Spanish names were San Blas, given by de Quiros' captain Diego de Prado y Tovar, and Corral de Agua is found in some contemporary charts (in Spanish, water corral). Marutea was later explored by Edward Edwards, while he was searching for the mutineers of HMS Bounty in 1791. Edwards renamed it "Lord Hood".

According to Russian Admiral Adam Johann von Krusenstern Marutea was once inhabited by the ancient Polynesians. British mariner Frederick William Beechey found a stone-walled hut upon it in 1825.

In 1984 Marutea Atoll was bought by Robert Wan, the main Tahitian black pearl trader, in order to engage in cultured black pearl farming.

A private airfield was built in 1993.

== Administration ==
Administratively Marutea Sud belongs to the commune of the Gambier (commune).
