= Thomas Ebrill =

British merchant

Thomas Ebrill (also spelt Abrill) was a British merchant, who from 1826 to 1842 worked with the ships the Minerva, Star and Amphitrite in the Pacific Ocean and is known for his discovery of the Acteon group.

== Life ==
Ebrill's early life is unknown. He lived in Tahiti in 1820 along with his brother-in-law Samuel Pinder Henry with whom he had a sugar cane plantation. His numerous trade and transport trips had taken him throughout Polynesia but also to Sydney in Australia and Valparaíso in Chile. From 1832 to 1839 he ran a pearl farm on the Gambier Islands but in 1833, he discovered the Acteon group whilst captain of the Amphitrite. In 1839 he came to the aid of the French captain Cyrille Pierre Théodore Laplace who was stranded on the reef of Tahiti. On 1 November 1842 at the Isle of Pines, New Caledonia, Ebrill and his crew fell victim of an attack by the Melanesians where his ship was looted and burned.
