= Krusenstern =

Krusenstern or Kruzenshtern may refer to:

- Adam Johann von Krusenstern (1770–1846), Baltic German admiral and explorer who circumnavigated the world in Russian service

== Places named after von Krusenstern ==
- Krusenstern (crater), on the Moon
- Krusenstern Island (disambiguation)
  - A small group of islands in the Middendorff Bay
  - Little Diomede Island, in Alaska
  - Ailuk Atoll, in the Marshall Islands
  - Tikehau-Atoll, of Tuamotu Archipelago in French Polynesia
  - Krusenstern Island, Krusenstern Reef, or Krusenstern Rock, a phantom reef south of the Northwestern Hawaiian Islands
- Krusenstern Strait, Kuril Islands, Russia
- Cape Krusenstern, in Alaska
  - Cape Krusenstern National Monument in Alaska
- Mount Krusenstern, Novaya Zemlya, Russia

== Other uses ==
- Kruzenshtern (ship) (until 1946 German Padua), a Russian tall ship training vessel
- Krusenstern field, a natural gas field in Russia
- Cape Krusenstern, at the west end of Coronation Gulf, Canada
