= Mataiva =

Atoll in French Polynesia

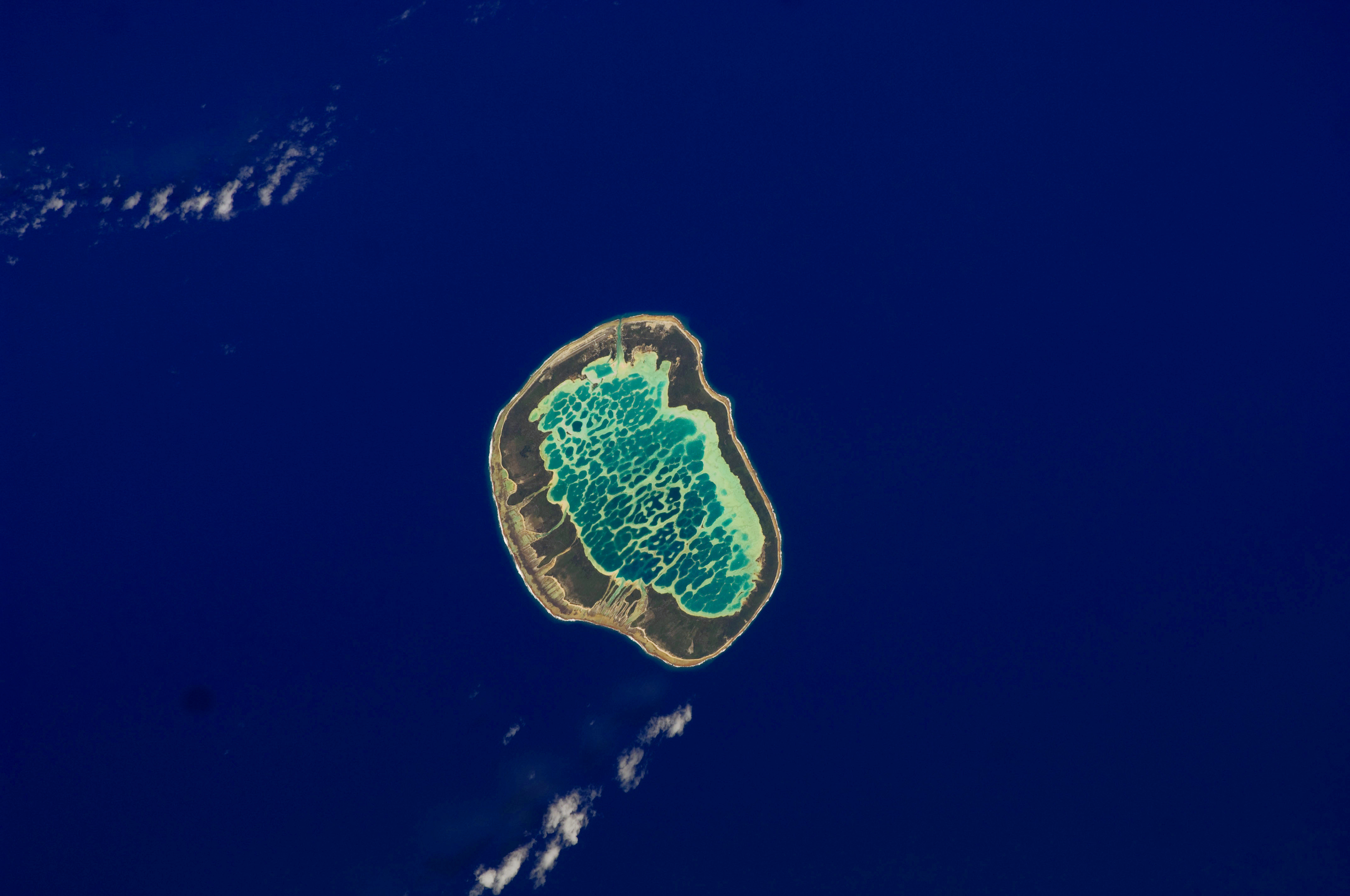
- NASA picture of Mataiva Atoll

- Location within French Polynesia

Geography
- Location: Pacific Ocean
- Coordinates: 14°53′S 148°43′W
- Archipelago: Tuamotus
- Area: 16 km^{2} (6.2 sq mi) (lagoon); 25 km^{2} (10 sq mi) (above water)
- Length: 10 km (6 mi)
- Width: 5.36 km (3.331 mi)
- Highest elevation: 14 m (46 ft)
- Highest point: (unnamed)

Administration
- France
- Overseas collectivity: French Polynesia
- Administrative subdivision: Tuamotus
- Commune: Rangiroa
- Largest settlement: Pahua

Demographics
- Population: 280 (2012)

Mataiva (meaning "Nine Eyes" in Tuamotuan), Tepoetiriura ("Sparkling Pearl") or Lazarev atoll is a coral atoll in the Tuamotu Archipelago. It is located in the Palliser group, and is the westernmost of the Tuamotus. The nearest atoll, Tikehau, is located 35 km to the east. Rangiroa is located 79 km to the east, and Tahiti is 311 km to the south.

== Geography ==
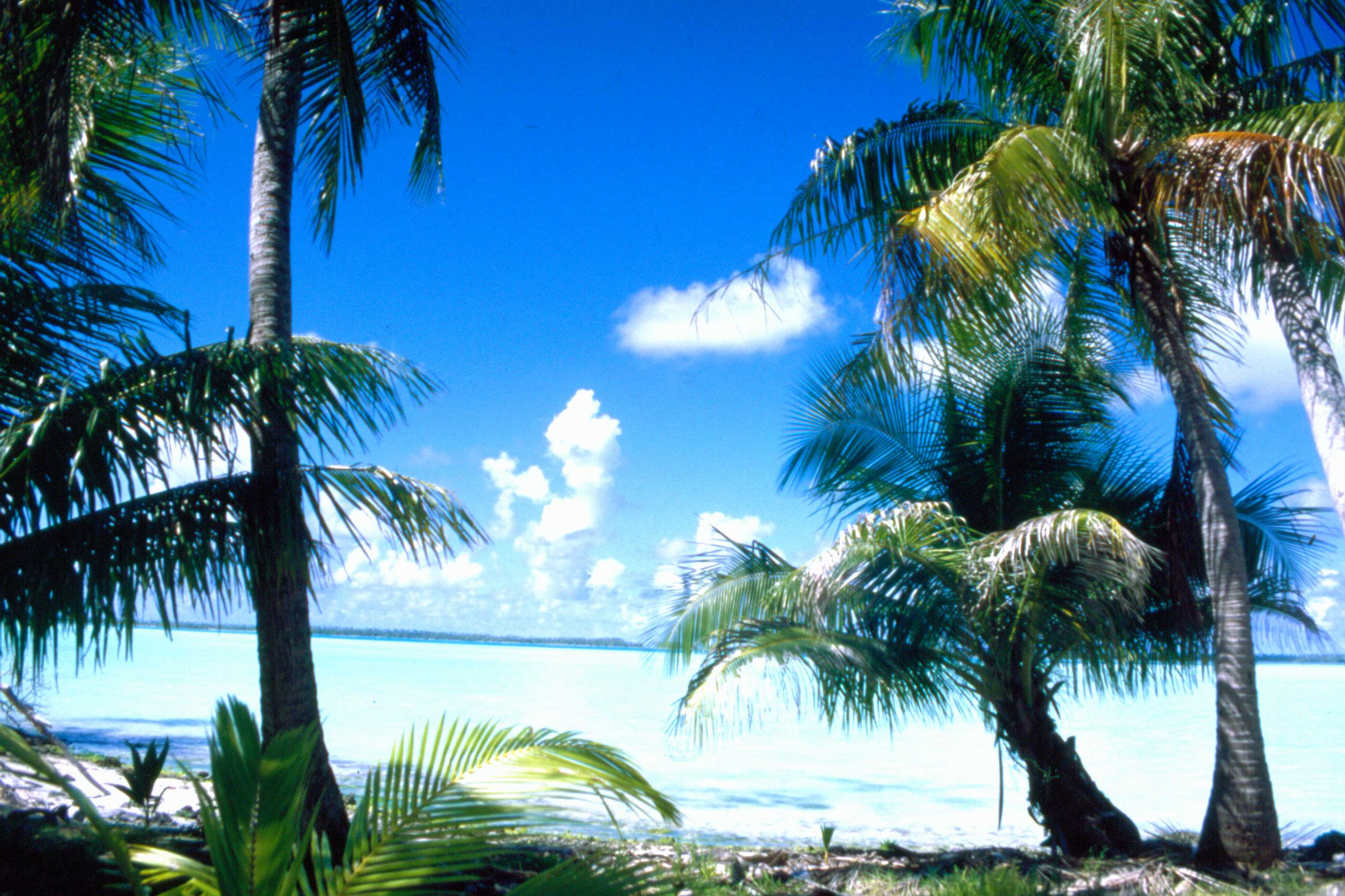
Mataiva lagoon

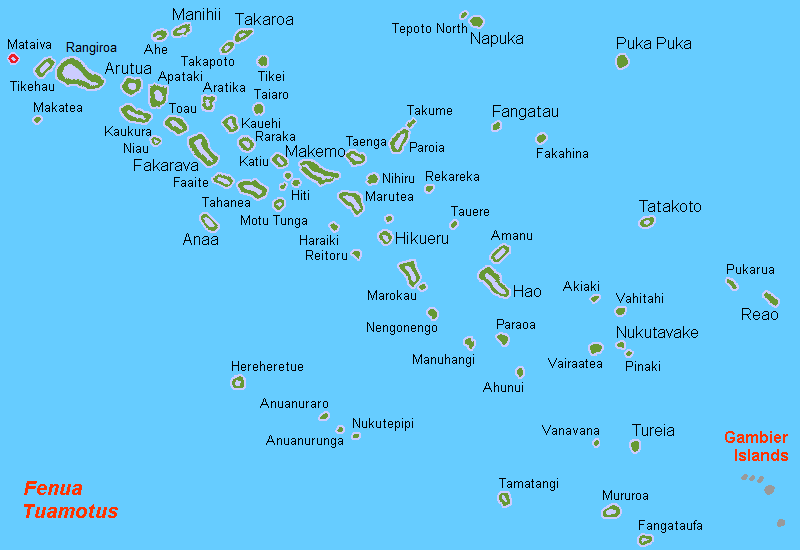
Mataiva in French Polynesia

The atoll's oval-shaped lagoon is 5.3 km wide and 10 km long, and is almost completely surrounded by land. In the lagoon the decaying coral morphed into linear rocky structures 50 to 300 meters wide. Some of these coral structures top above the water, forming about 70 basins. The varying depths of these basins and the clear water gives the lagoon a blue and green tesselated appearance when viewed from above. This type of lagoon structure is unique in French Polynesia. Rich phosphate deposits have been discovered at the bottom of these basins, up to an estimated 10 to 15 million tonnes. Although similar deposits exist in Makatea and Nauru, Mataiva inhabitants and ecosystems protection activists have successfully prevented its exploitation for the time being.

The lagoon is open to the sea at a single pass in the Northwest, the site of Pahua, the only village on the atoll. The pass at Pahua is only a few feet deep and is not navigable; the 110 m (360 ft.) concrete levee, which connects the two halves of the village, is the longest bridge in French Polynesia. A number of narrow passages (known in Tuamotuan as hoa'a) along the south-central part of the reef are known as the "Nine Eyes", giving the name to the atoll. Aside from the rocky coral features, there are also several small islets located within the lagoon serving as a sanctuary and breeding ground for rare maritime birds.

The forest on the atoll is vastly untouched by human activity.

== History ==
The first recorded European to visit Mataiva was the Russian Admiral and oceanic explorer Fabian Gottlieb von Bellingshausen, on July 30, 1820 on ships Vostok and Mirni. He named this atoll "Lazarev" after Mikhail Lazarev.

On April 14, 1980, the voyaging canoe Hokule'a - a replica of an ancient vessel of the kind that carried native explorers throughout the Pacific - made landfall on Mataiva. The canoe had been navigated from Hawaii without instruments or charts for 31 days by Nainoa Thompson. Thompson navigated in the ancient way - using only the stars, winds, waves and flight of birds to find land. In the last 26 years Hokule'a has voyaged virtually all the routes taken by Polynesians throughout the Pacific, helping to ignite a renaissance of culture among Polynesians everywhere.

Mataiva Airport was inaugurated in 1999. Air Tahiti operates flights to Papeete.

In the southeastern part of the main island is an ancient ceremonial platform (marae in Tuamotuan), called Marae Papiro, after its association with a pre-Christian turtle cult. It is constructed of large blocks of cut coral and was the site of the main village on the atoll until 1906. It is one of the most important archaeological sites in the Tuamotus.

== Economy ==
Mataiva's primary export is vanilla, cultivated at a small plantation on the interior of the island. The islands are covered with coconut palms, the source of the other main economic activity: copra production. Since the inauguration of the airport in 1999, tourism is becoming a new economic activity on Mataiva.

== Administration ==
Mataiva Atoll belongs to the commune of Rangiroa, which consists of 3 atolls (Rangiroa itself, Tikehau and Mataiva, and a separate island (Makatea).
