= Arutua =

Atoll in French Polynesia

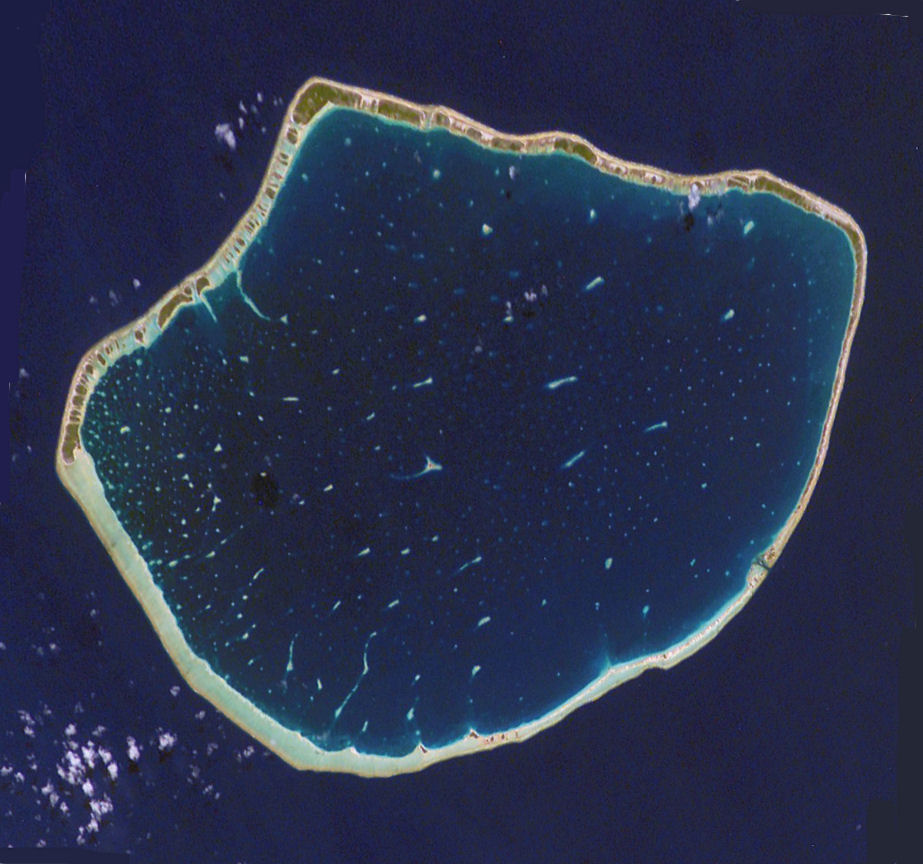
- NASA picture of Arutua Atoll

- Location within French Polynesia

Geography
- Location: Pacific Ocean
- Coordinates: 15°14′43″S 146°36′43″W
- Archipelago: Tuamotus
- Area: 484 km^{2} (187 sq mi) (lagoon); 15 km^{2} (6 sq mi) (above water)
- Length: 31 km (19.3 mi)
- Width: 24 km (14.9 mi)

Administration
- France
- Overseas collectivity: French Polynesia
- Administrative subdivision: Îles Tuamotu-Gambier
- Commune: Arutua
- Largest settlement: Rautini

Demographics
- Population: 826 (2022)

Arutua
- Commune
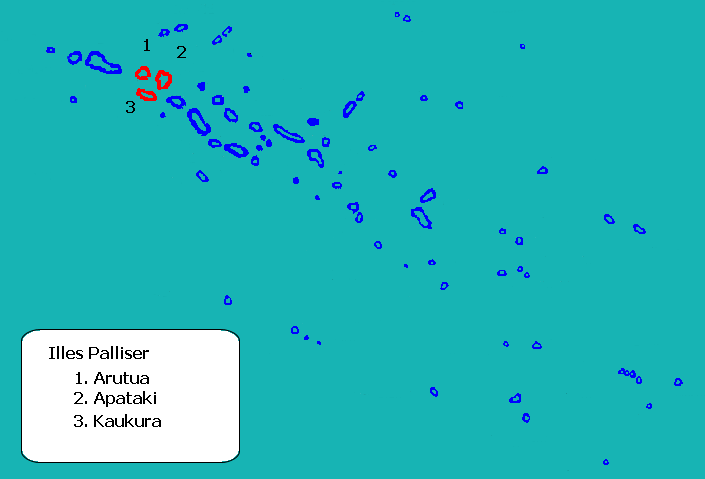
- Location (in red) within the Tuamotu Archipelago
- Location of Arutua
- Coordinates: 15°14′43″S 146°36′44″W
- Country: France
- Overseas collectivity: French Polynesia
- Subdivision: Îles Tuamotu-Gambier
- Area^{1}: 46.0 km^{2} (17.8 sq mi)
- Population (2022): 1,736
  - Density: 37.7/km^{2} (97.7/sq mi)
- Time zone: UTC−10:00
- INSEE/Postal code: 98713 /
- ^{1} French Land Register data, which excludes lakes, ponds, glaciers > 1 km^{2} (0.386 sq mi or 247 acres) and river estuaries.

Arutua, or Ngaru-atua is an atoll in the Tuamotu group in French Polynesia. It is located 40 km SW of Rangiroa. The closest land is Apataki Atoll, only 16 km to the East.

Arutua Atoll has a roughly pentagonal shape. Length 31 km (19 mi) , width 24 km (15 mi) . The lagoon area is 484 km^{2} (187 sq mi) and the land area is 15 km^{2} (6 sq mi). Its lagoon is wide and deep with one navigable passage. As of 2012, Arutua had a population of 680 inhabitants. The main village is Rautini. There is a small airport at Arutua which was opened in 1984.

Geographically Arutua belongs to the Palliser Islands (Îles Palliser) subgroup of the Tuamotus.

== History ==
The first recorded European to visit Arutua Atoll was Jakob Roggeveen (who also first sighted Easter Island) in 1722. British mariner Frederick Beechey touched at Arutua in 1826. He named this atoll "Cockburn Island".

== Administration ==
This atoll is part of the commune of Arutua, which consists of Arutua, as well as the atolls of Apataki and Kaukura. The seat of the commune is the village Rautini. The commune is in the administrative subdivision of the Îles Tuamotu-Gambier.

== Demographics ==
Island	Population (2017 census)	Area (km^{2})	Area of lagoon (km^{2})
Apataki	442	20.0	706
Arutua	808	15.0	484
Kaukura	414	11.0	434
TOTAL	1664	46.0	1624

Table 1. Current population.

Island	2007	2012	2017
Apataki	495	350	442
Arutua	725	680	808
Kaukura	541	475	414
TOTAL	1761	1505	1664

Table 2. Population over time.

== Images and maps ==
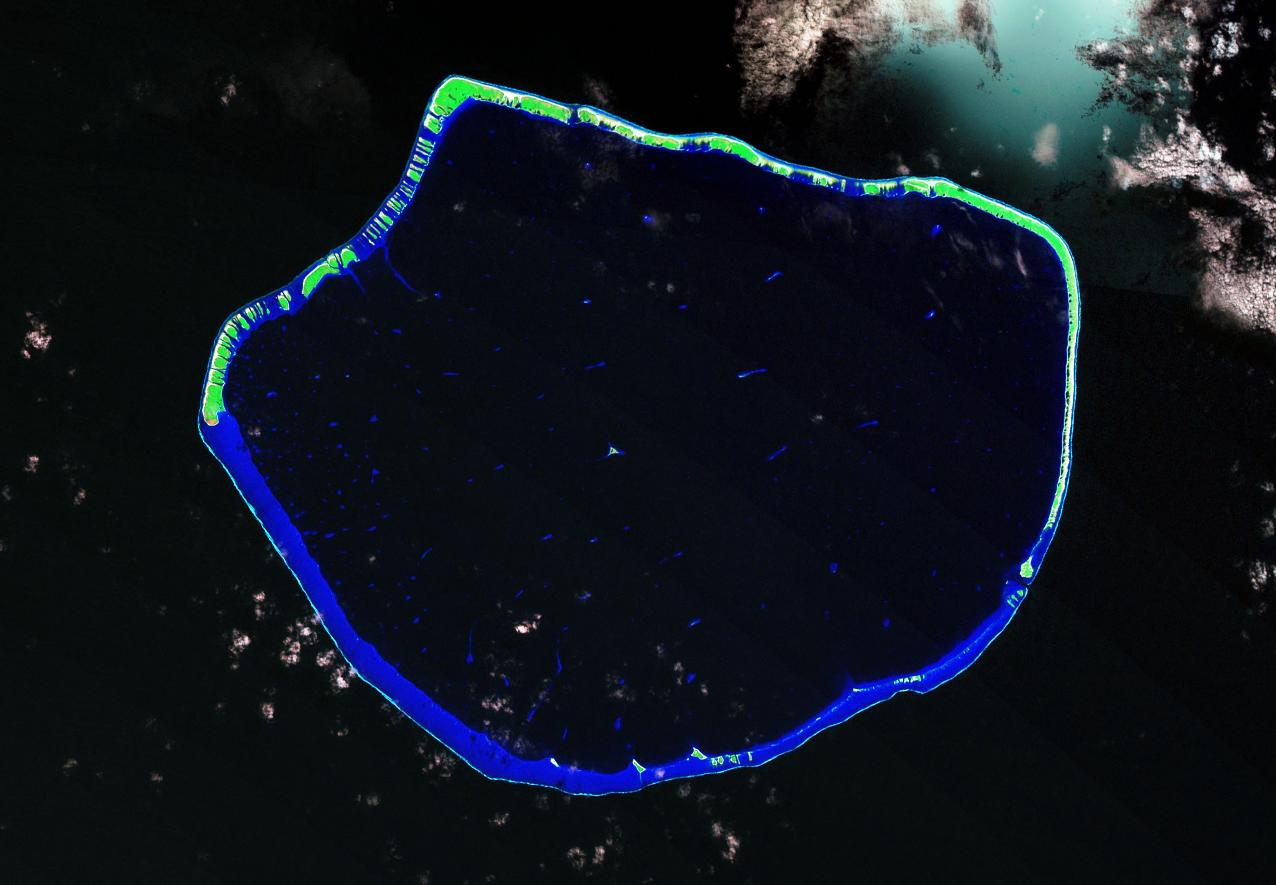
Image Source: Landsat S-06-15_2008

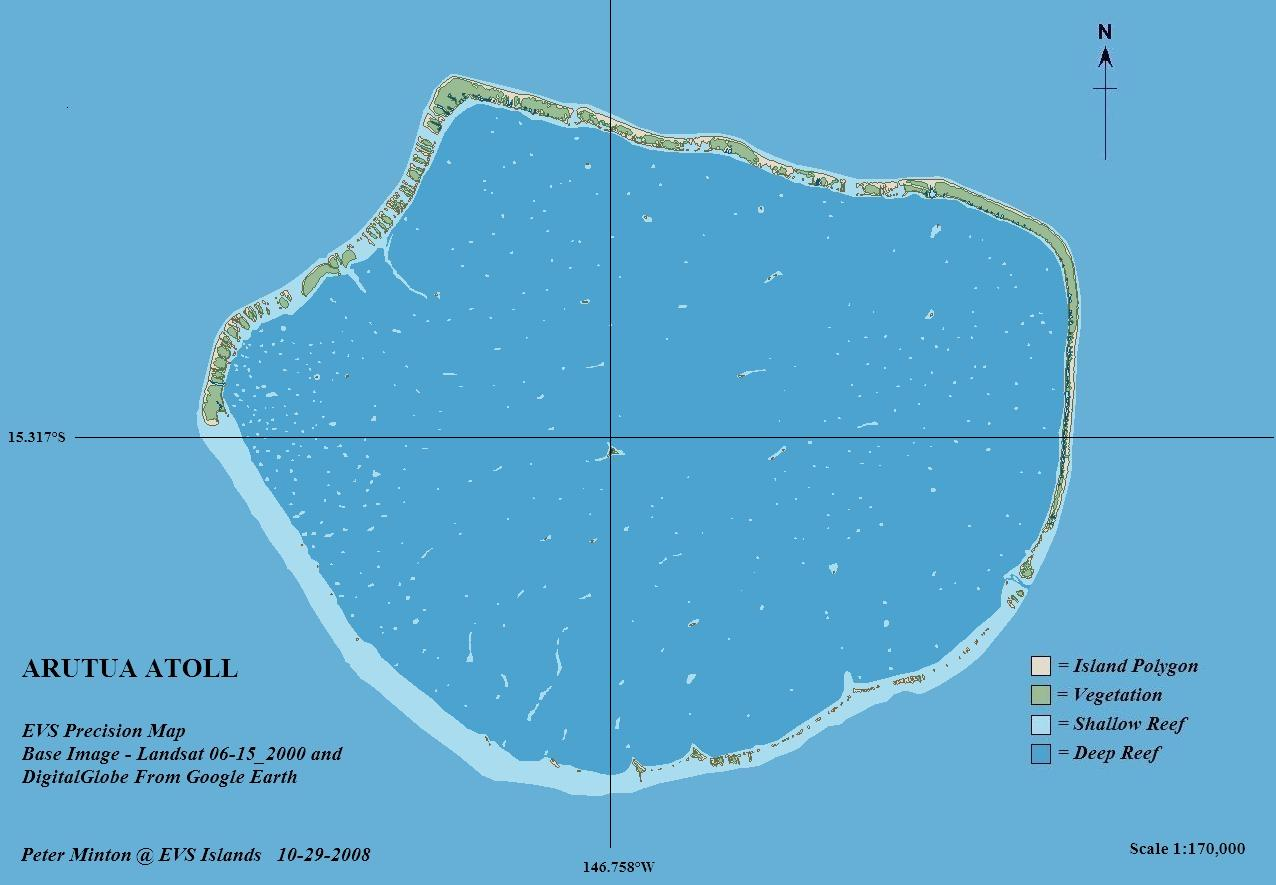
Map Source: EVS Precision Map (1:170,000)
