= Tiputa =

Village in French Polynesia

Coordinates: 14.976°S 147.625°W

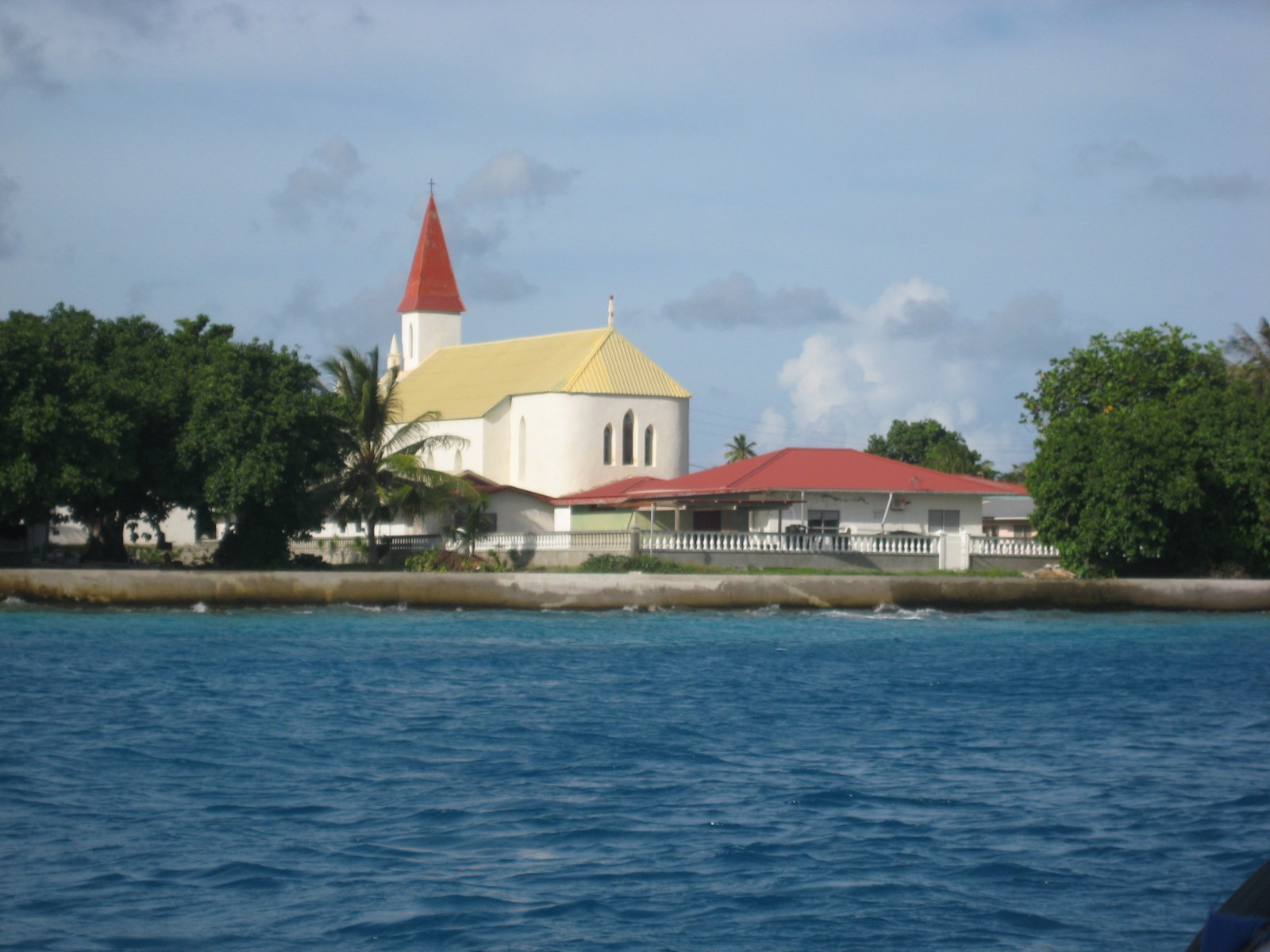
Tiputa Church of Notre-Dame-de-Paix

Tiputa is a village on the French Polynesian atoll of Rangiroa, in the Tuamotu archipelago.

== Geography ==
It is located on the northern edge of the atoll, approximately 7 kilometres (4.3 mi) east-southeast of the village of Avatoru. The two villages are separated by the Tiputa Pass, a world-renowned spot for underwater diving. It is necessary to travel to Avatoru by means of a water taxi to make it to Rangiroa Airport.

The population of Tiputa is around 900 inhabitants, making it the most populous village of the atoll of Rangiroa. The main economical activity in Tiputa is tourism. There are hotels and other touristic installations.
