= Palliser Islands =

Archipelago in French Polynesia

Coordinates: 15.125°S 147.646°W

Location of the Palliser Islands in the Pacific Ocean

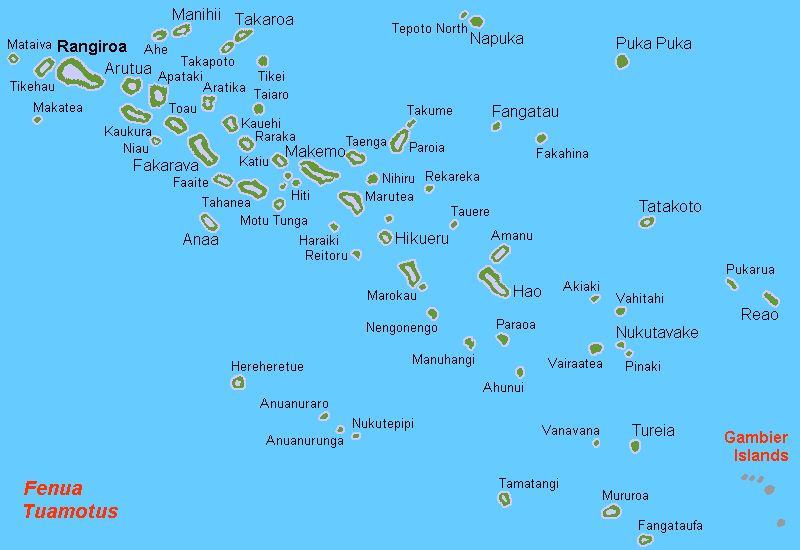
Map of the Tuamotus; the Pallisers are located northwest-most in the main Tuamotu atoll cluster.

The Palliser Islands or Pallisers are a subgroup of the Tuamotu group in French Polynesia. They are located in the very northwest of the main group of atolls.

== Atolls ==
The group includes:

- Apataki
- Arutua
- Fakarava
- Kaukura
- Mataiva
- Rangiroa
- Makatea
- Tikehau
- Toau

== Administration ==
- Administratively, Arutua, Apataki and Kaukura atolls belong to the commune of Arutua, with a total population of 1510 inhabitants.
- Toau and Fakarava, belong to the commune of Fakarava. The total population is of 1800 inhabitants.
- The commune of Rangiroa consists of 3 atolls: Rangiroa itself, Tikehau and Mataiva, and a separate island (Makatea). The total population is of 3467 inhabitants.

== History ==
The Palliser Islands were named "Palliser's Isles" by Captain James Cook, who was the first European to sight them, on 19 April and 20 April 1774; naming them as such in honour of Admiral Sir Hugh Palliser.
