= Kaukura =

Atoll in French Polynesia

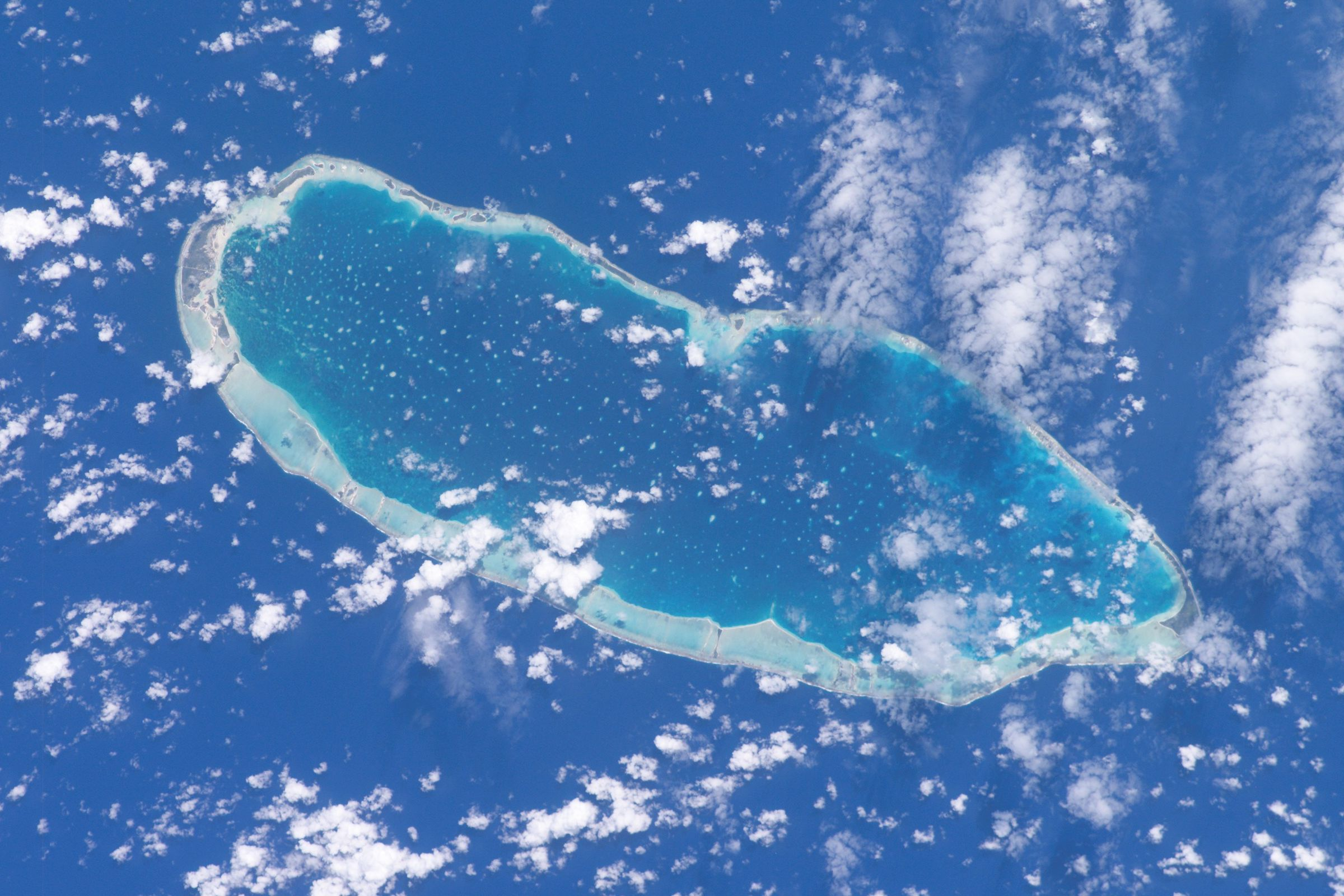
- NASA picture of Kaukura Atoll

- Location within French Polynesia

Geography
- Location: Pacific Ocean
- Coordinates: 15°39′S 146°53′W
- Archipelago: Tuamotus
- Area: 434 km^{2} (168 sq mi) (lagoon); 13.5 km^{2} (5 sq mi) (above water)
- Length: 47 km (29.2 mi)
- Width: 13 km (8.1 mi)

Administration
- France
- Overseas collectivity: French Polynesia
- Administrative subdivision: Tuamotus
- Commune: Arutua
- Largest settlement: Raitahiti

Demographics
- Population: 475 (2012)

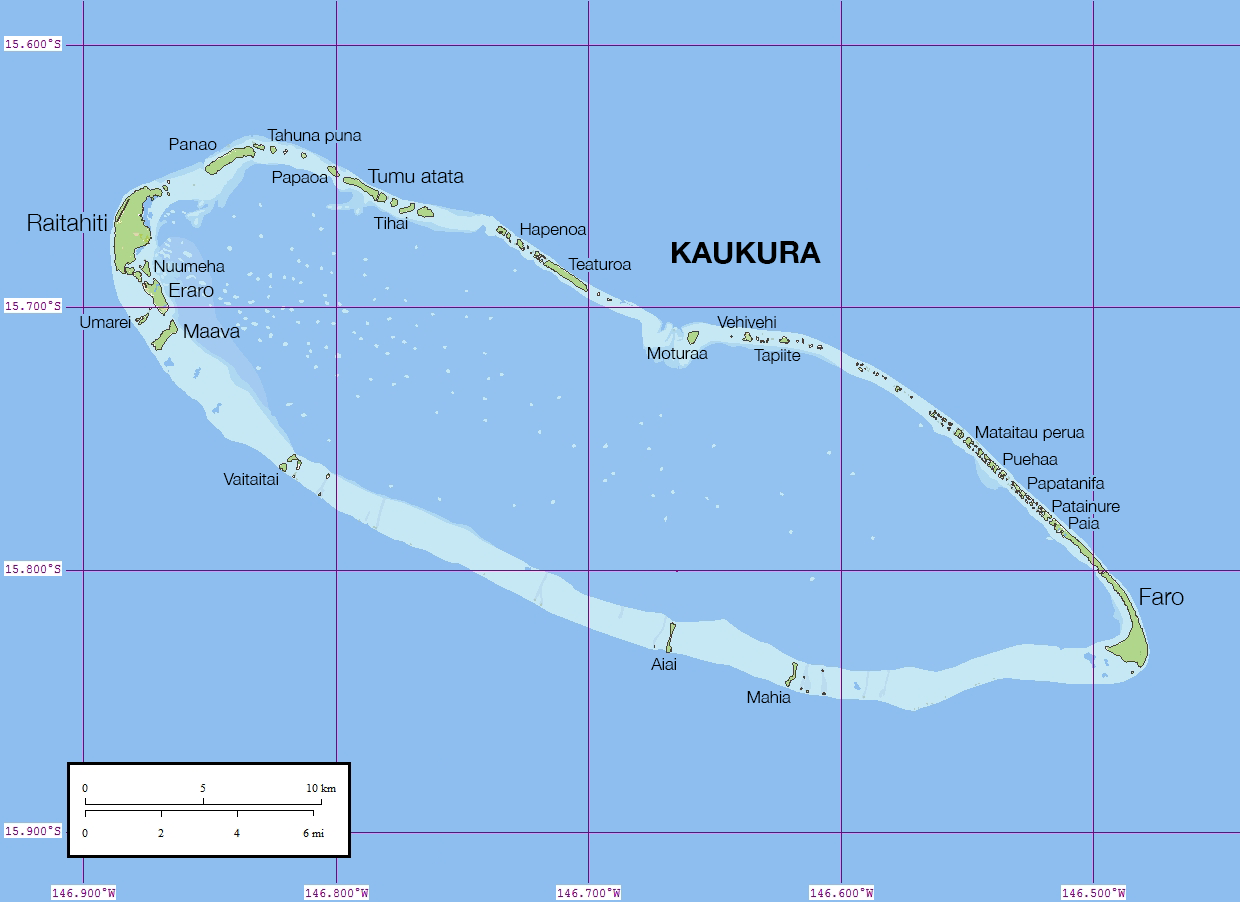
Map of Kaukura Atoll

Kaukura or Kaheko is an atoll in the Tuamotu group in French Polynesia, 48 km (30 mi) long and 15 km (9 mi) wide. It is in the western area of the archipelago, 58 km (36 mi) southeast of Rangiroa. The closest land is Apataki Atoll, 24 km (15 mi) to the northeast.

Kaukura Atoll is elongated, with a length of 47 km (29 mi) and a maximum width of 13 km (8 mi). The northern reef rim is narrow, while the southern is broad. There are two groups of 65 islets. The surface of Kaukura's lagoon is 434 km^{2} (168 sq mi) and the land area 13.5 km^{2} (5 sq mi). It has only one navigable pass cutting through the reef.

The most important island is Motu Panao, in the atoll's northwest. Kaukura has 475 inhabitants as of 2012; the main village is Raitahiti.

Geographically Kaukura belongs to the Palliser Islands (Îles Palliser) subgroup of the Tuamotus.

== History ==
The first recorded European to arrive to Kaukura was Dutch Navigator Jakob Roggeveen on his expedition for the Dutch West India Company to seek Terra Australis in 1722.

Formerly, fishing was the main occupation of Kaukura's islanders. But presently, tourism has replaced the traditional activities as a source of income.

There is a small airport at Kaukura which was opened in 1994.

== Administration ==
Kaukura belongs to the commune of Arutua. The commune of Arutua consists of Arutua, as well as the atolls of Apataki and Kaukura.

== See also ==
- Kaukura Airport
