= Tikehau =

Atoll in French Polynesia

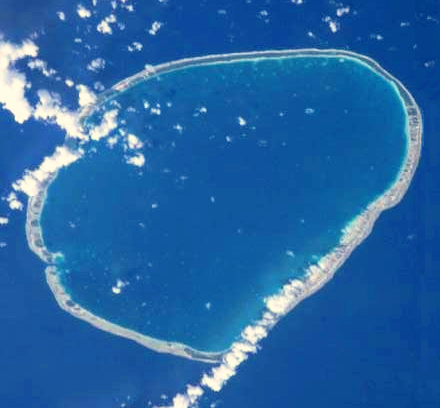
- Satellite photograph of Tikehau Atoll.

- Location within French Polynesia

Geography
- Location: Pacific Ocean
- Coordinates: 15°4′12″S 148°7′48″W
- Archipelago: Tuamotus
- Area: 461 km^{2} (178 sq mi) (lagoon); 20 km^{2} (8 sq mi) (above water)
- Length: 27 km (16.8 mi)
- Width: 19 km (11.8 mi)
- Highest elevation: 8 m (26 ft)

Administration
- France
- Overseas collectivity: French Polynesia
- Administrative subdivision: Tuamotus
- Commune: Rangiroa
- Capital: Avatoru

Demographics
- Population: 529 (2012)

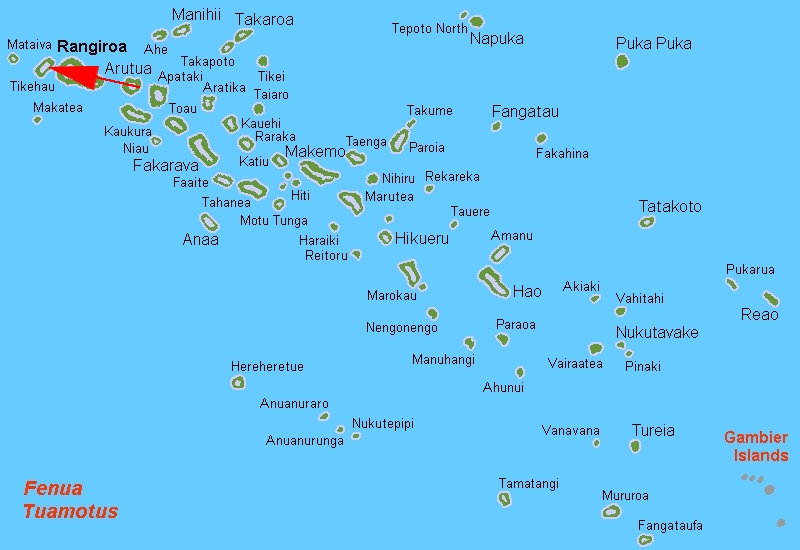

Tikehau (meaning Peaceful Landing in Tuamotuan) or Porutu-kai is a coral atoll in the Palliser Islands group, part of the Tuamotu Archipelago in French Polynesia. It is included in the commune of Rangiroa.

== History ==
The first recorded European to arrive to Tikehau was the Russian mariner Otto von Kotzebue. He called this atoll Krusenstern Island, (Note: Krusenstern Island may also refer to other places; see Krusenstern Island (disambiguation)) after Russian explorer Adam Johann von Krusenstern. The Wilkes Expedition passed by this atoll on 9 September 1839.

On a visit in 1987, Jacques Cousteau's research group made a study of Tikehau's lagoon and discovered that it contains a greater variety of fish species than any other place in French Polynesia.

Today, Tikehau is a tourist destination, popular for its pink sand beaches and its exceptional underwater fauna.

== Geography ==
Tikehau is located 340 kilometres (210 miles) northeast of Tahiti in the Tuamotu Islands. The nearest atoll, Rangiroa, lies only 12 kilometres (7.5 miles) to the east. Mataiva, the westernmost atoll of the same group, is located 35 kilometres (22 miles) to the west.

The atoll's oval-shaped lagoon is 27 kilometres (17 miles) long and 19 kilometres (12 miles) wide with a lagoon area of about 461 square kilometres (178 square miles). The atoll is made up of two major islands and numerous islets. The northeastern quarter of the atoll is a single, mostly uninhabited island. The whole atoll is surrounded by an almost continuous coral reef. There is a single pass deep and wide enough for navigation in and out of the lagoon: Tuheiava Pass is located on the western shore. The islands and islets are covered with coconut palms. The main village is called Tuherahera.

=== Geology ===
Geologically, the atoll is the coral outgrowth (10 meters) of the summit of the volcanic mountain of the same name, 1,750 meters high, from the ocean floor, which was formed some 63.5 to 65.1 million years ago.

Tikehau, along with Niau and especially Makatea, is an elevated atoll (the highest point is 10 meters above sea level) resulting from a fossa, i.e., a coral reef that was exposed and "dolomitized" when it was pulled out of the water during a lithosphere bulge between 1 and 2 million years ago.

=== Fauna and flora ===
During his numerous expeditions, Jacques Cousteau defined the sea surrounding this island as one of the richest in fish in the world. In fact, Tikehau's lagoon is home to eagle rays, schools of barracuda and tuna, hammerhead sharks, gray sharks, turtles, dolphins and a variety of other animals.

The atoll is also home to numerous bird colonies, such as the Tahitian long-billed reed warbler (Acrocephalus caffer), the Tuamotu thyllopope (Ptilinopus coralensis) and the rare parrot Vini peruviana.

== Economy ==
Tikehau has a traditional fishing industry with fish farms located near the Tuheiava Passage, as well as a small pearl farming industry.

However, the atoll's economy is mainly based on tourism, developed around the "Tikehau Pearl Beach" resort, whose activity increased with the construction of a 1,200-meter-long airfield in 1977. and 40,000 passengers a year, a third of which are in transit, making it one of the busiest in the Tuamotus. In addition, since 2018, the atoll has had four licensed hydrosurfaces (three in the south of the lagoon, one on the oceanic drop-off) that allow seaplanes to land.

Other major sources of income are government-subsidized copra extraction and commercial fishing. There is a bakery, two small stores and a small bar. In 2001, a small sawmill was built with government assistance, where three to five locals find work. There is also a diving center, a luxury hotel and an airport with the IATA code TIH.

== Transportation ==
Tikehau Airport, located on the southern tip of the atoll, was inaugurated in 1977. There are daily flights to and from Tahiti and other atolls of the Tuamotus.

== Religion ==
Most of the population, as in the rest of the Tuamotus Islands, follows Christianity as a consequence of the activity of both Catholic and Protestant missionaries. The Catholic church has a religious building on the site known as St. Nicodemus Church (Église de Saint-Nicodème) whose history dates back to 1867, although the present structure was consecrated only in 1992. It depends on the Metropolitan Archdiocese of Papeete with headquarters on the island of Tahiti.

== Additional photographs and maps ==
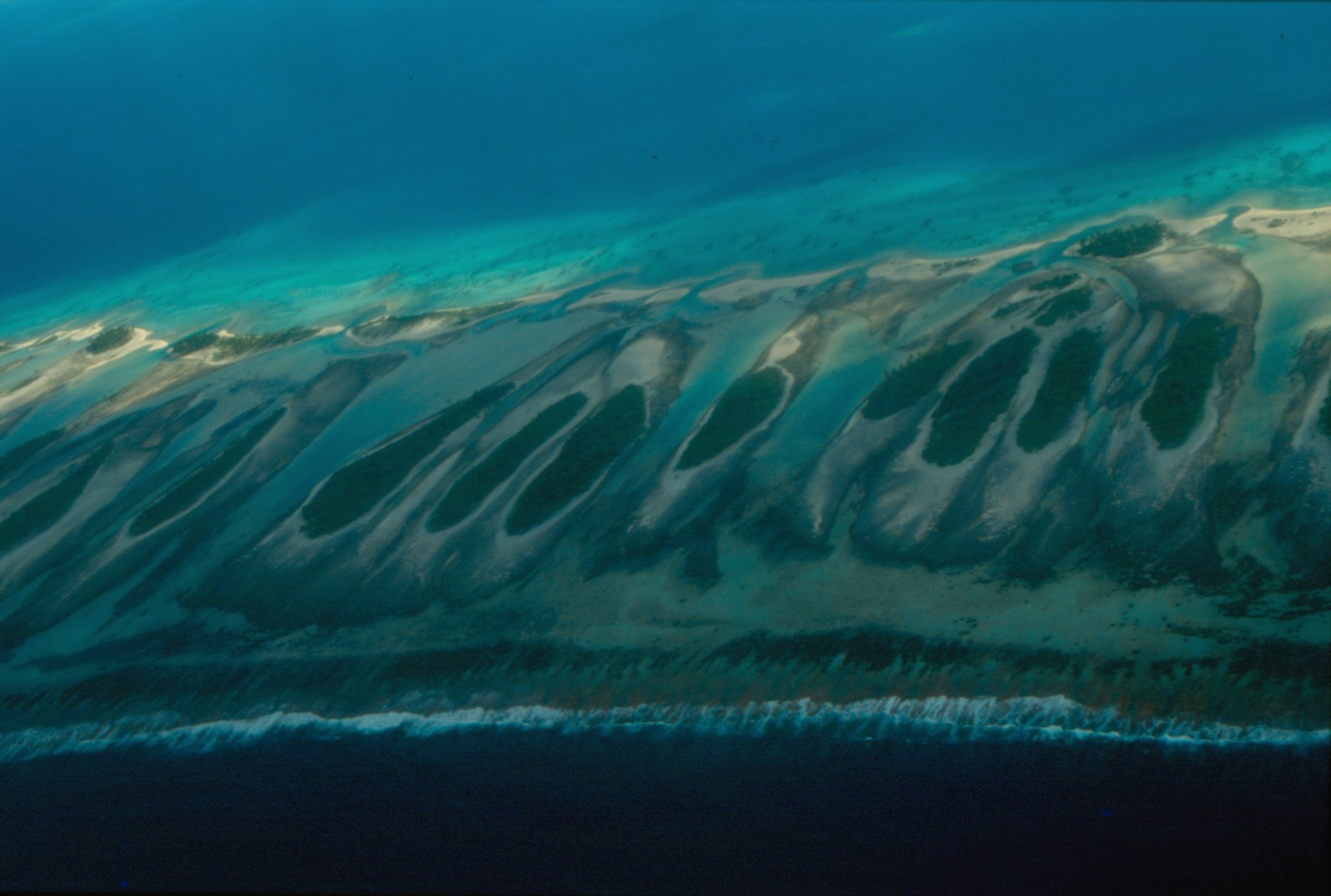
Southeastern part of the Tikehau atoll, showing multiple islets

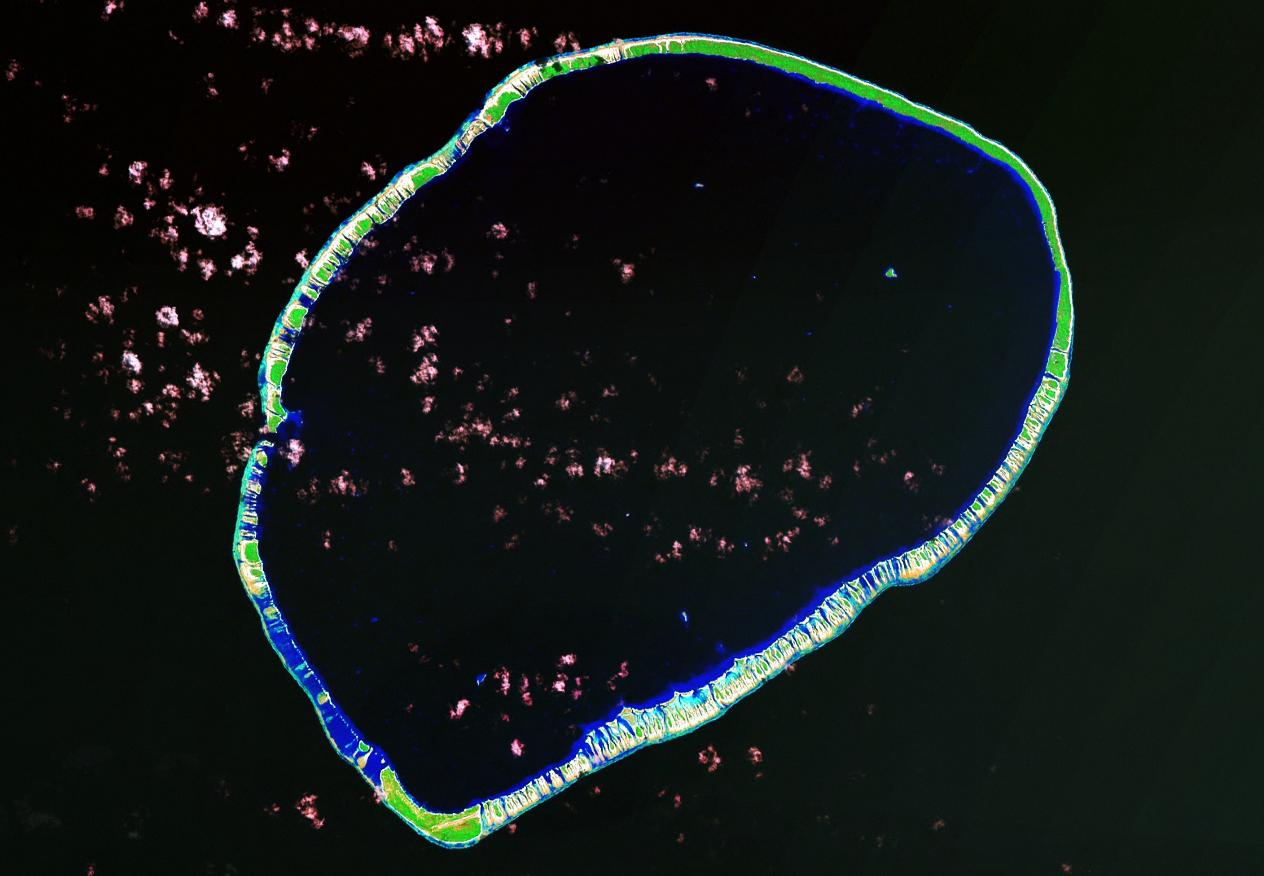
Image Source: Landsat S-06-10_2000 and S-06-15_2000

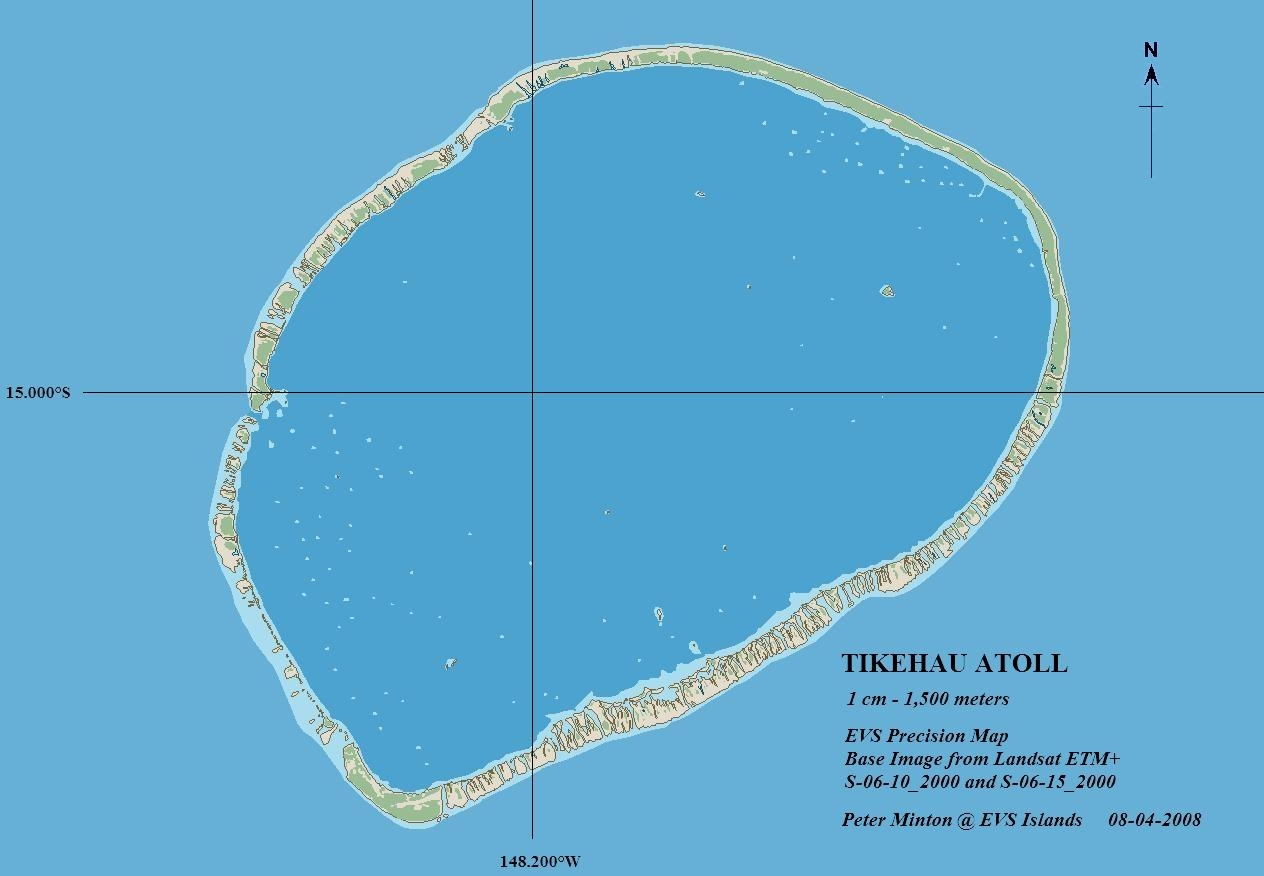
Map Source: EVS Precision Map (1:150,000)

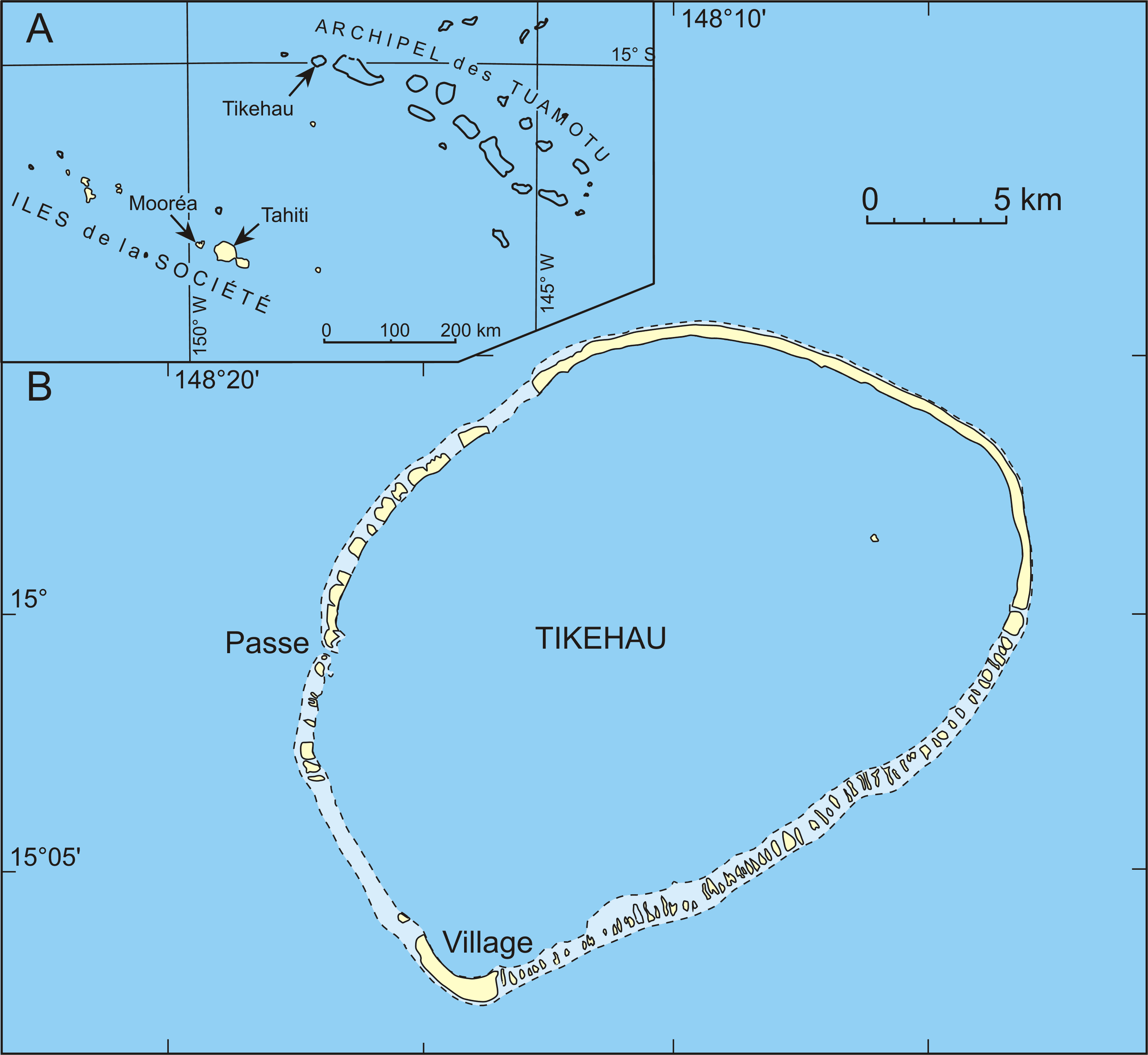
Map Source: Other Map

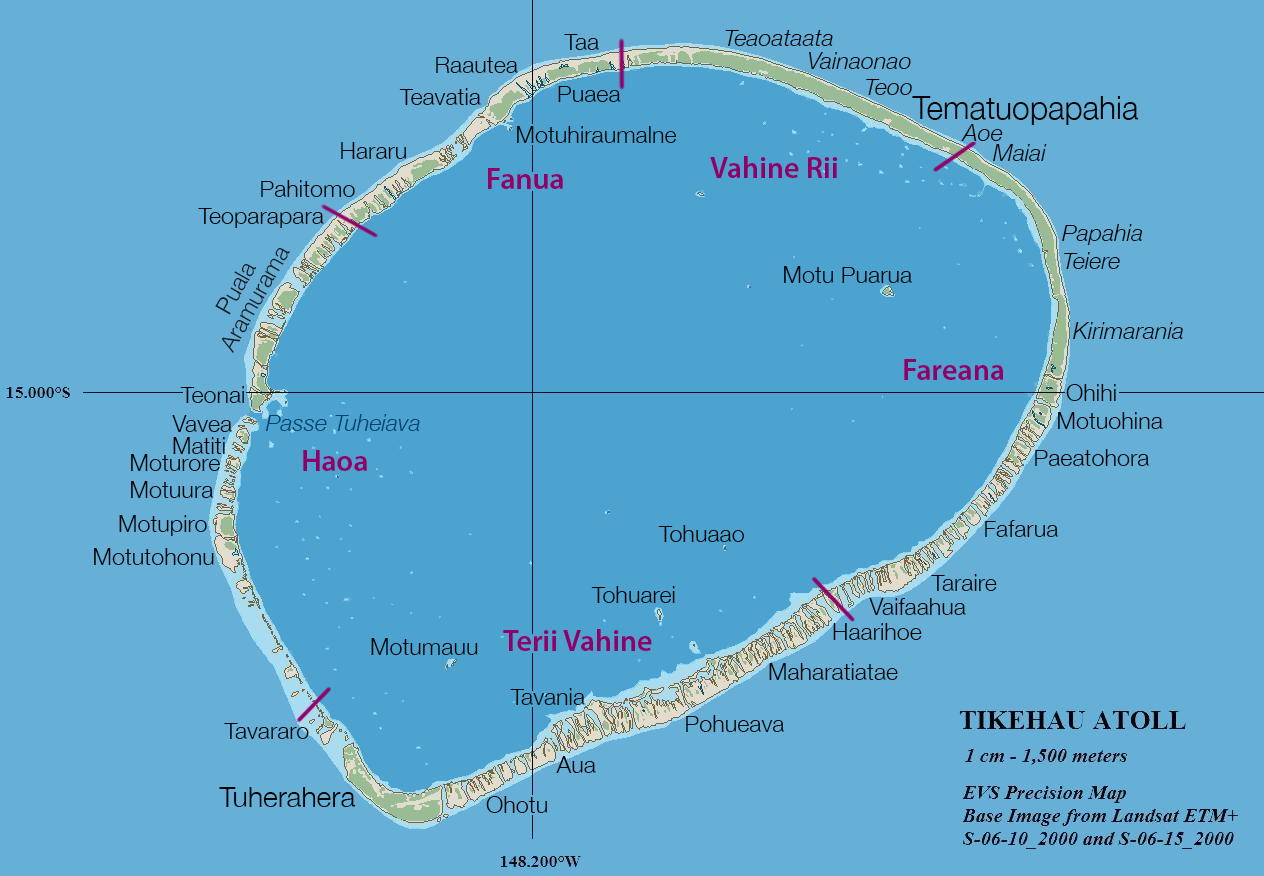
Map of Tikehau
