= Rangiroa (commune) =

Commune in French Polynesia, France

- Commune
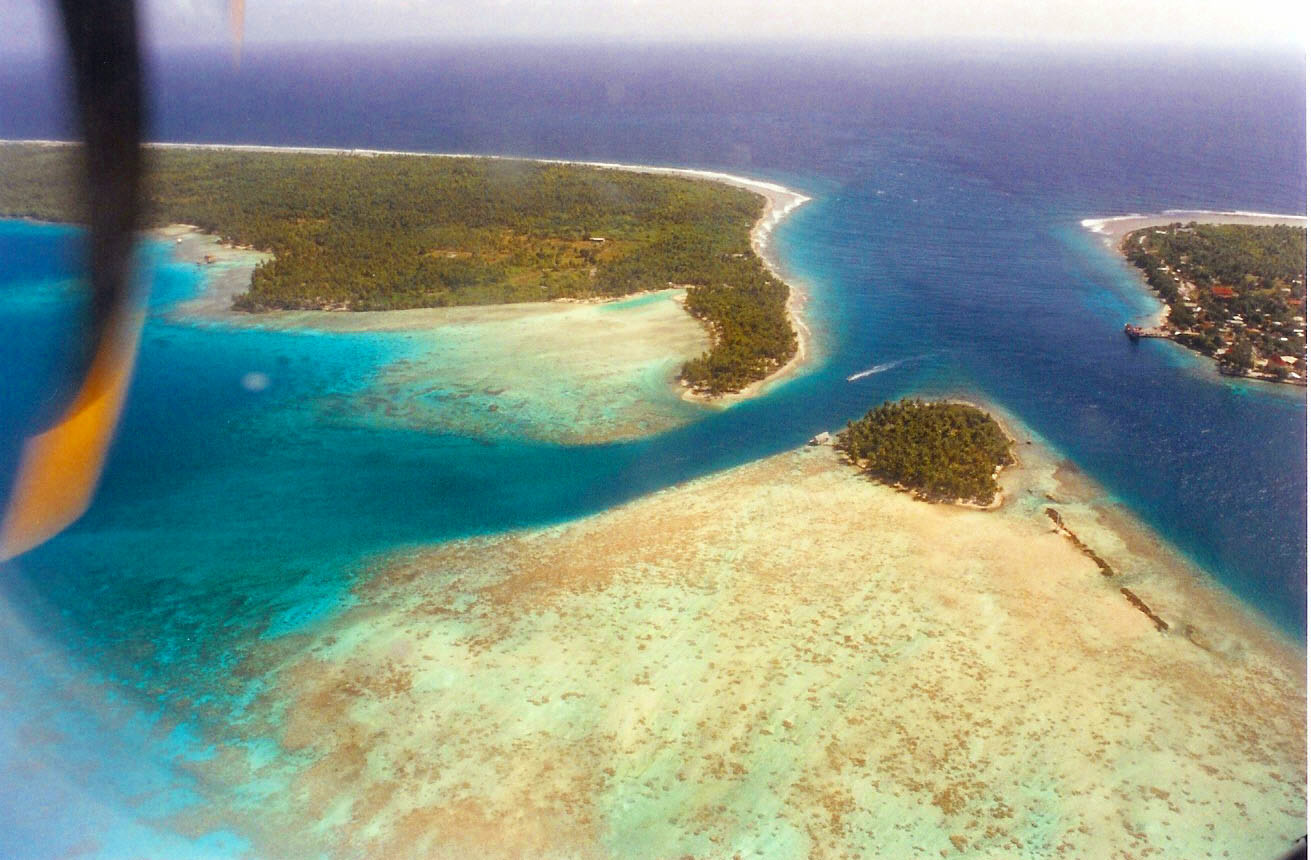
- Avatoru Pass, atoll of Rangiroa

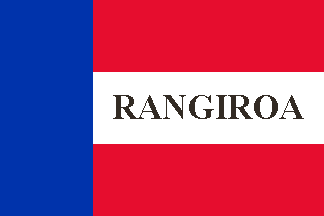
- Flag

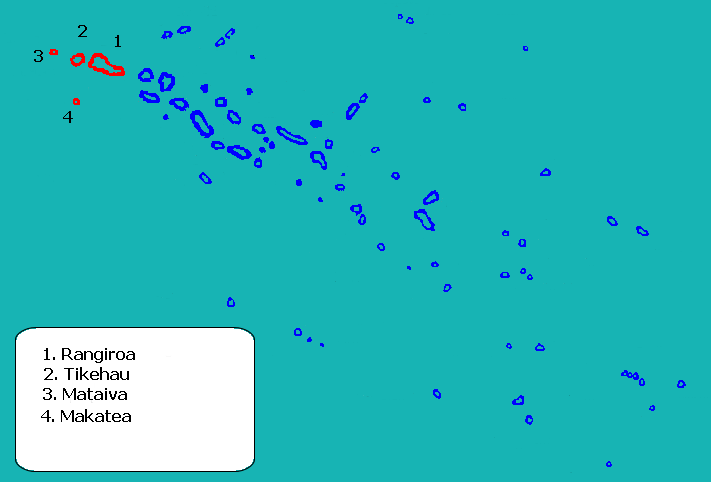
- Location (in red) within the Tuamotu Archipelago
- Location of Rangiroa
- Coordinates: 14°57′01″S 147°39′04″W
- Country: France
- Overseas collectivity: French Polynesia
- Subdivision: Îles Tuamotu-Gambier

Government
  - Mayor (2021–2026): Tahuhu Maraeura
- Area^{1}: 139 km^{2} (54 sq mi)
- Elevation: 0 m (0 ft)
- Population (2022): 3,761
  - Density: 27.1/km^{2} (70.1/sq mi)
- Time zone: UTC−10:00
- INSEE/Postal code: 98740 /
- ^{1} French Land Register data, which excludes lakes, ponds, glaciers > 1 km^{2} (0.386 sq mi or 247 acres) and river estuaries.

Rangiroa is a commune of French Polynesia in the archipelago of the Tuamotu Islands. The commune includes four islands: Rangiroa, Tikehau, Mataiva and Makatea. The chef-lieu is the village Tiputa.

== Geography ==
=== Commune of Rangiroa ===
The commune is composed of three atolls and one island:

Atoll or island	Main village	Population 2022	Area above water(km^{2})	Lagoon (km^{2})	Coordinates
Rangiroa^{1}	Avatoru	2,785	79	1,446	15°07′S 147°37′W
Tikehau^{1}	Tuherahera	589	20	400	15°01′S 148°10′W
Mataiva^{1}	Pahua	292	16	25	14°53′S 148°40′W
Makatea^{1}	Moumu	95	24	-	15°51′S 148°15′W
Rangiroa commune	Avatoru	3,761	139	1,871	

^{1}Commune associée

== See also ==
- Communes of French Polynesia
