= Tiputa Pass =

Strait in French Polynesia

Coordinates: 14.973°S 147.629°W

Tiputa Pass is a strait in the northwest portion of Rangiroa lagoon in the Tuamotu Islands of French Polynesia, joining the lagoon to the open ocean. There are only two such passes in Rangiroa, the second one being Avatoru Pass. Tiputa Pass separates the villages of Avatoru and Tiputa.

== Scuba diving ==
Tiputa Pass is a well-known scuba-diving destination. During the austral summer (December to March), great hammerhead sharks and manta rays are present in the area.

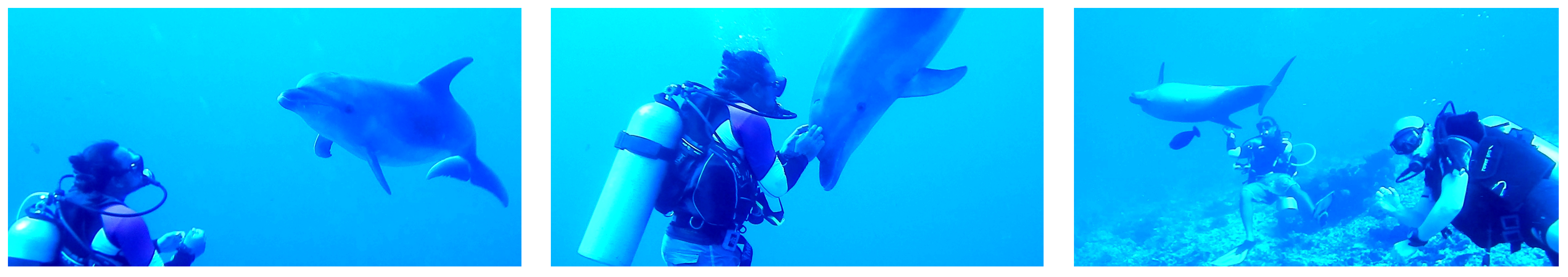
Scuba divers and dolphins in the Tiputa pass.
