= Kaukura Airport =

Kaukura Airport Aérodrome de Kaukura
- IATA: KKR; ICAO: NTGK

Summary
- Airport type: Public
- Operator: DSEAC Polynésie Française
- Serves: Kaukura
- Location: Kaukura, Tuamotu, French Polynesia
- Elevation AMSL: 3 m / 10 ft
- Coordinates: 15°39′53″S 146°53′07″W

Map
- Location of the airport in French Polynesia

Runways
Direction	Length		Surface
Direction	m	ft	Surface
02/20	1,080	3,543	Paved
- Source: French AIP.

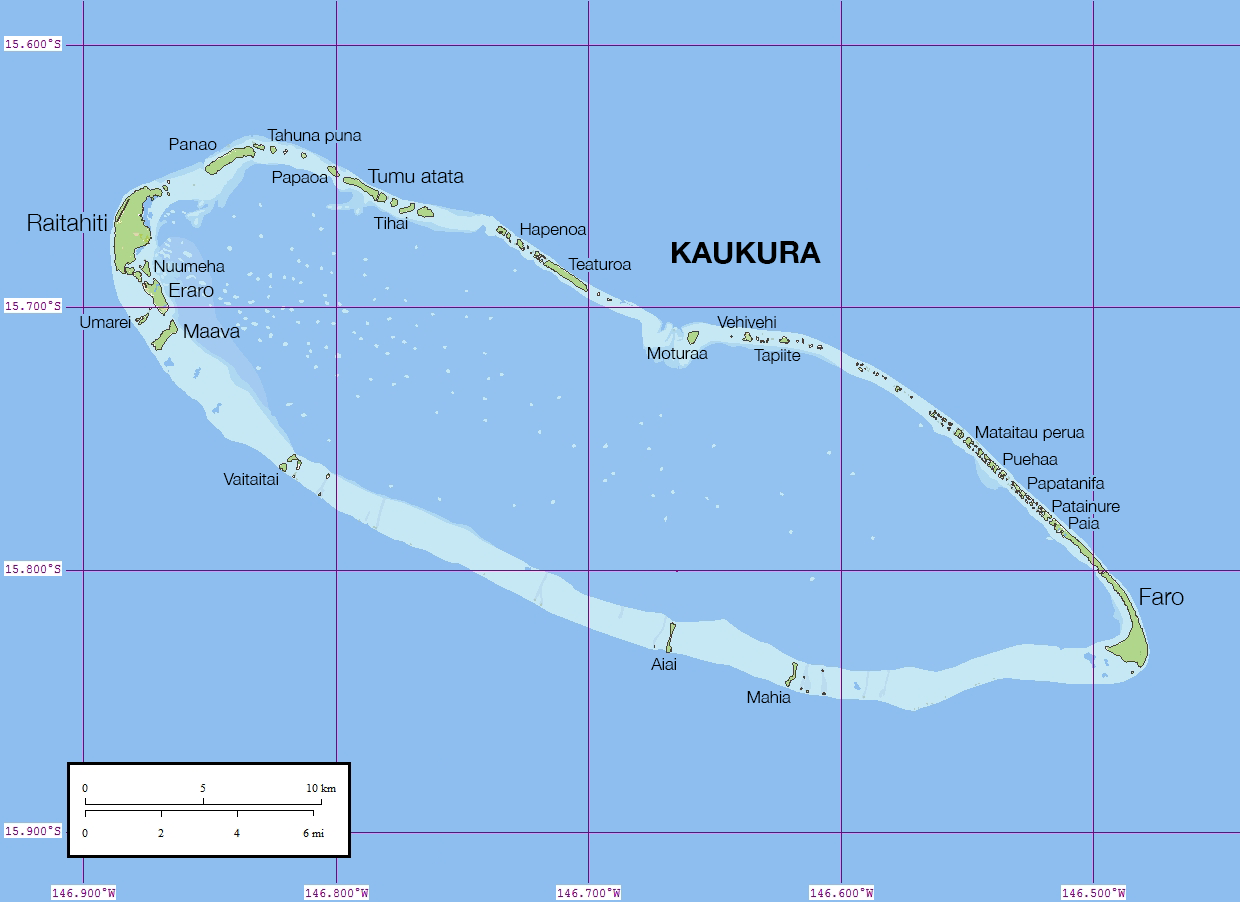
Map of Kaukura Atoll, with the airport in the northwest

Kaukura Airport (IATA: KKR, ICAO: NTGK) is an airport on Kaukura Atoll in French Polynesia. The airport is about 700 meters northwest of the village of Raitahiti on the islet of Tuteva, which is located at the northwest corner of the atoll.

== Airlines and destinations ==
No scheduled flight as of May 2019.

== See also ==
- List of airports in French Polynesia
