= Pacific (1978 album) =

Studio album by Haruomi Hosono, Shigeru Suzuki & Tatsuro Yamashita
- Released: June 21, 1978
- Genres: Jazz fusion; city pop
- Length: 38:45
- Label: CBS/Sony
- Producer: Masatoshi Sakai

Haruomi Hosono chronology
Paraiso (1978)	Pacific (1978)	Cochin Moon (1978)

Pacific is a 1978 album featuring instrumental compositions by Japanese musicians Haruomi Hosono, Shigeru Suzuki and Tatsuro Yamashita. It is the first in the CBS/SONY Sound Image Series.

The album shows a small island named Motu Fara that is part of the Avatoru Pass.

== Critical reception ==
Jen Monroe of Listen to This called the album "a classic," stating "its unabashed tropical nostalgia acts as a jumping off point for flitting between genres (lounge, funk, disco, rhumba, smooth jazz, Latin fusion, synth pop), all delivered in full-color with jaunty, winking songwriting."

== Track listing ==
No.	Title	Composition/Arrangement	Length
1.	"The Last Paradise (最後の楽園)"	Hosono	4:03
2.	"Coral Reef (コーラル・リーフ)"	Suzuki	3:45
3.	"Nostalgia of Island (Part 1: Wind Bird, Part 2: Walking on the Beach)(ノスタルジア・オブ・アイランド～パート1:バード・ウィンド/パート2:ウォーキング・オン・ザ・ビーチ)"	Yamashita	9:37
4.	"Slack Key Rumba (スラック・キー・ルンバ)"	Hosono	3:02
5.	"パッション・フラワー (Passion Flower)"	Suzuki	3:35
6.	"ノアノア (Noanoa)"	Suzuki	4:10
7.	"キスカ (Kiska)"	Yamashita	5:26
8.	"Cosmic Surfin'"	Hosono	5:07

== Personnel ==
- Haruomi Hosono, Shigeru Suzuki, Tatsuro Yamashita – Music
- Tsuguya Inoue (井上嗣也) – Designer
- Shinichi Hashimoto (橋本伸一) – Director
- Yuichi Maejima (前島祐一) – Engineer
- "Teppei" Kasai (笠井“鉄平”) – Associate Engineer
- Shinpei Asai (浅井慎平) – Photographer
- Masatoshi Sakai (酒井政利) – Producer

== See also ==
- 1978 in Japanese music
