= SS Ocean Queen (1908) =

Coordinates: 15.85°S 148.25°W

History

Norway
- Name: Ocean Queen
- Owner: Jacob Christensen
- Operator: Jacob Christensen
- Builder: William Gray & Co., West Hartlepool
- Cost: £45,000
- Yard number: 760
- Launched: 8 December 1908
- Sponsored by: Miss Arundel
- Commissioned: 10 February 1909
- Homeport: Bergen
- Identification: Call sign MFNB
- Fate: Wrecked, 16 September 1909

General characteristics
- Type: Cargo ship
- Tonnage: 3,188 GRT; 2,828 NRT; 4,500 DWT
- Length: 338.0 ft (103.0 m)
- Beam: 43.6 ft (13.3 m)
- Depth: 16.3 ft (5.0 m)
- Installed power: 348 Nhp
- Propulsion: Central Marine Engine Works 3-cylinder triple expansion
- Speed: 12 1/2 knots (23.2 km/h; 14.4 mph)

Ocean Queen was a steam cargo ship built in 1908 by the William Gray & Co. of West Hartlepool for Jacob Christensen of Bergen. The ship was designed and built as a bulk carrier, but was wrecked on her maiden voyage.

== Design and construction ==
In late 1890s Albert Ellis, who worked for the Pacific Islands Company Ltd, discovered rich phosphate rock deposits on several Pacific islands, including Nauru and Makatea. Soon, the Pacific Islands Company was transformed into the Pacific Phosphate Company, with their founders Baron Stanmore and John T. Arundel investing into phosphate trade and establishing a virtual monopoly on phosphate shipments to both Australia and New Zealand. Mining started in 1906 in Nauru, and the company needed more vessels to transport the cargo.

Ocean Queen was laid down at William Gray & Co. shipyard in West Hartlepool and launched on 8 December 1908 (yard number 760), with Miss Arundel, of Kensington serving as a sponsor. After successful completion of sea trials on 10 February 1909 Ocean Queen was handed over to her owners on the same day. The ship was able to achieve and maintain an average speed of 12.0 knots (13.8 mph; 22.2 km/h) during the sea trials. The vessel was primarily intended as a bulk carrier, designed to the specifications of the Pacific Phosphate Company Ltd, but also accommodations for a large number of first and second-class passengers in houses on the spar deck were built. Additionally, electric lighting, refrigerating machinery, and cold chambers, and the ventilation were installed to suit the tropical climate where it was intended to operate the vessel.

As built, the ship was 338.0 feet (103.0 m) long between perpendiculars and 43.6 feet (13.3 m) abeam, and had a mean draft of 16.3 feet (5.0 m). Ocean Queen was assessed at 3,188 GRT and 2,828 NRT. The vessel had a steel hull, and a single 348 nhp triple-expansion steam engine, with cylinders of 24-inch (61 cm), 38-inch (97 cm) and 64-inch (160 cm) diameter with a 42-inch (110 cm) stroke, that drove a single screw propeller, and moved the ship at up to 12.5 knots (14.4 mph; 23.2 km/h).

== Operational history ==
After delivery Ocean Queen was immediately sent to the Pacific and left Hartlepool on 26 February. The ship called off at Antwerpen to load some machinery to be delivered to several mining locations in the South Pacific, and Plymouth which she departed on 10 March 1909. The ship passed Cape Town on 7 April, eventually arriving in Sydney on 4 May. Among the passengers arriving from England on the vessel there were John T. Arundel, his private secretary and his three daughters, Dorothy, Lilian, and Sydney Arundel. Ocean Queen was scheduled for a five-month long voyage, visiting Ocean Island, Pleasant Island, several islands adjacent to Tahiti where a new venture was to be opened, and also envisioned a visit to Honolulu. After loading general cargo for the islands and 1,200 tons of coal, the vessel departed Sydney on 26 May. After calling at island ports, Ocean Queen loaded phosphates at Ocean Island and sailed on to Hawaii arriving at Honolulu on 23 July. The vessel left Hawaii in early August and took course to Tahiti and Makatea, and from there she was scheduled to visit Nauru on 5 October to take her first load of phosphate for Australia.

=== Sinking ===
Ocean Queen departed Papeete under command of Captain Christian Johanessen on 15 September 1909. She arrived in view of Makatea around 07:00 in the morning of 16 September. The ship was flying full colors in observance of King Edward VII's birthday, and went around to the eastern side of the island of Makatea, close to the settlement of Maumu, instead of the weather shore where she was supposed to deliver her cargo. At around 10:30, while parading herself to the locals, the eccentric rod bent and jammed her engines, rendering them useless. A strong current, present on the lee side of Makatea, carried the vessel towards the shore, throwing and grounding her on the reefs about twenty minutes later. Around 13:00, after all attempts to repair the engines were unsuccessful and seeing the deteriorating condition of the vessel, the captain ordered everybody to abandon ship. Lifeboats were lowered, and the crew and all passengers left the ship in orderly fashion. At approximately 20:00, after developing several holes in her bottom and sides from all the pounding on the rocks, Ocean Queen slid off the reef into the sea and sank in 200 fathoms (1,200 ft; 370 m) of water.

A boat was sent to Tahiti, and two schooners, Susanne and Cholita were dispatched the next day to pick up the crew and the passengers from Makatea. Upon arrival in Papeete, they boarded steamer SS Mariposa and sailed to San Francisco.
