= RGI =

RGI may refer to:

- Railway Gazette International, a monthly business journal
- Rangiroa Airport, French Polynesia
- Royal Glasgow Institute of the Fine Arts, art gallery in Glasgow, Scotland
- Rio Grande Industries, a railroad holding company name.
- Recommended for General Interchange, in the Unicode support of emojis.
- Resource Group International, merged into Aker ASA, a company owned by Norwegian businessman Kjell Inge Røkke
- RAND Graduate Institute, the original name of Pardee RAND, a graduate school in California
