= Apataki =

Atoll in French Polynesia

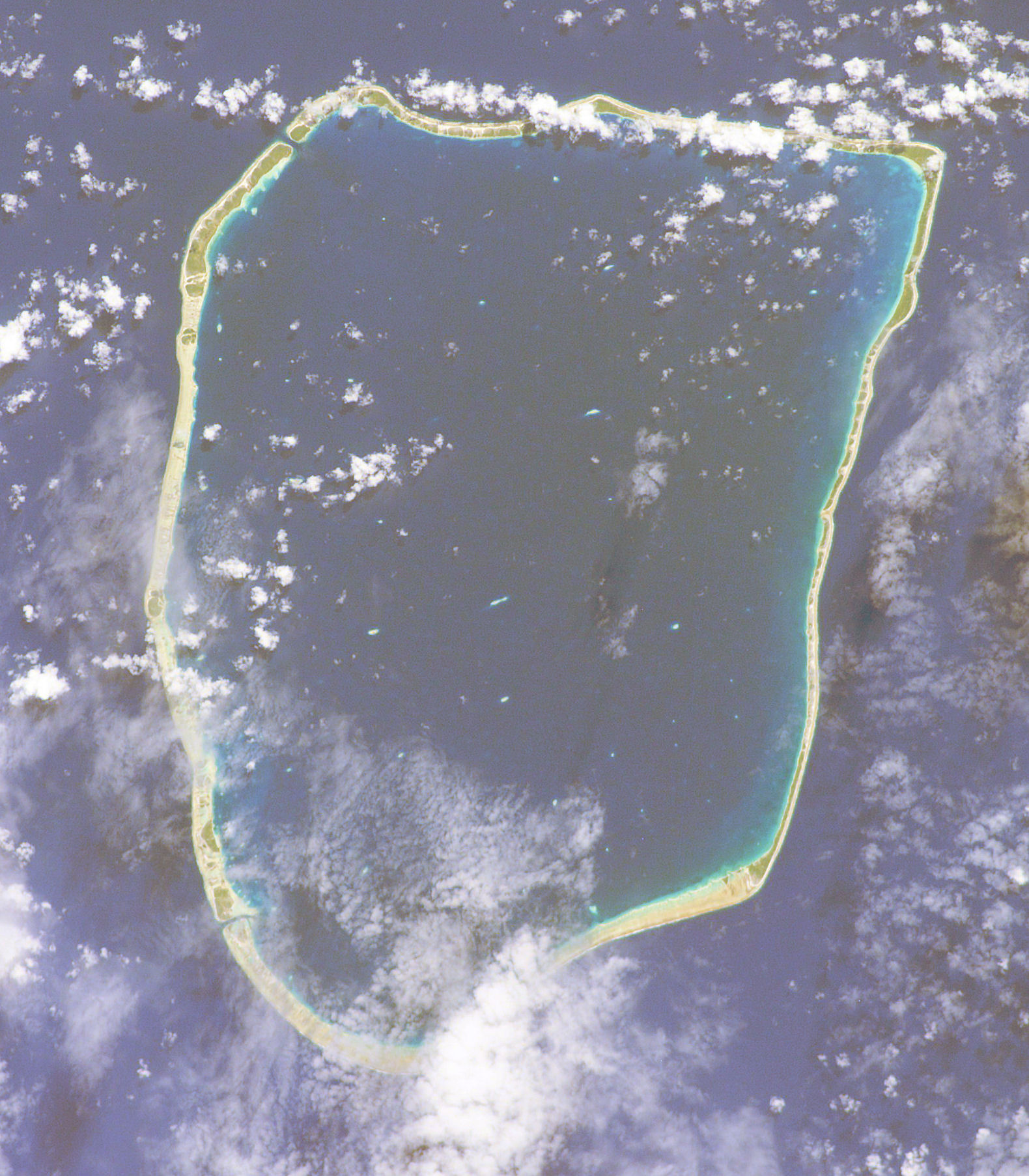
- NASA picture of Apataki Atoll

- Location within French Polynesia

Geography
- Location: Pacific Ocean
- Coordinates: 15°26′57″S 146°19′45″W
- Archipelago: Tuamotus
- Area: 706 km^{2} (273 sq mi) (lagoon); 21 km^{2} (8 sq mi) (above water)
- Length: 34 km (21.1 mi)
- Width: 24 km (14.9 mi)

Administration
- France
- Overseas collectivity: French Polynesia
- Administrative subdivision: Tuamotus
- Commune: Arutua
- Largest settlement: Niutahi

Demographics
- Population: 350 (2012)
- Pop. density: 18/km^{2} (47/sq mi)

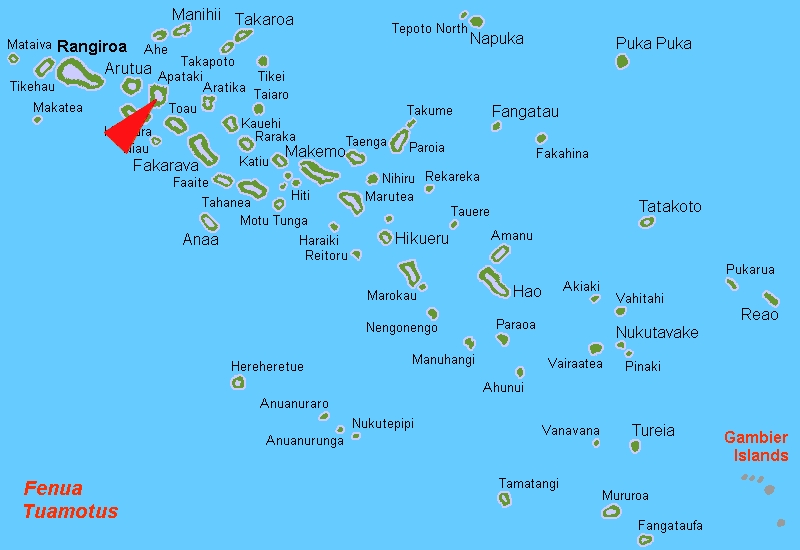
Location of Apataki Atoll

Apataki is a coral atoll in the South Pacific Ocean, territorially part of French Polynesia. It is one of the Palliser Islands, a subgroup of the Tuamotu Archipelago. Apataki is located approximately 370 kilometres (230 miles) northeast of the island of Tahiti, 17 km (11 mi) east of Arutua and 24 km (15 mi) northeast of Kaukura. The island is approximately rectangular; it is 34 km (21 mi) long and 24 km (15 mi) wide. It has a total area of approximately 706 km^{2} with a land area of approximately 21 km^{2} (8 sq mi). Two navigable passes enter its wide lagoon.

As of 2012, Apataki Atoll has 350 inhabitants, down from 492 in 2007. The main village is called Niutahi.

== History ==
The first recorded European to sight Apataki Atoll was Dutch navigator Jakob Roggeveen in 1722. It was visited by James Cook in 1774. On 27 May 1902, while Paul Gauguin was living in the Marquesas Islands, the mail-boat Croix du Sud between Papeete and Atuona was shipwrecked at Apataki. leading to a three-month loss of supplies for the islanders.

There is a domestic airfield in Apataki which was inaugurated in 1977. The island appears in some maps as "Hagemeister Island".

== Administration ==
Administratively, Apataki Atoll is part of the commune of Arutua.

== Economy ==
Apataki is connected to the world via Apataki Airport but has no tourism industry. The only main industry of the island is cultured Tahitian (black) pearls. The coconut palm, which forms the basis for copra (dried coconut) production, used to be of special economic importance to the islanders. On a few islands, the residents cultivate vanilla. Agriculture is generally limited to simple subsistence. Pandanus leaves are traditionally woven together as roof thatch (although corrugated sheet metal is also used today), as well as for other items such as mats and hats. The atoll also has a boatyard, providing winter boat storage and ship repairs.

Apataki's two large reef passes provide excellent diving and surfing, both of which are serviced by local boat-based charter companies. Land-based accommodations do not exist.

== Cuisine ==
Fruit and vegetable staples include yams, taro, and breadfruit, as well as a wide range of tropical fruits.

== Flora and fauna ==
The sparse soil of Apataki cannot sustain a great variety of vegetation. The animal life on the islands consists mostly of seabirds, landcrabs, insects, and lizards. The underwater fauna, however, is rich and varied, making scuba diving a popular activity for tourists.
