= Avatoru Pass =

Coordinates: 14.943°S 147.712°W

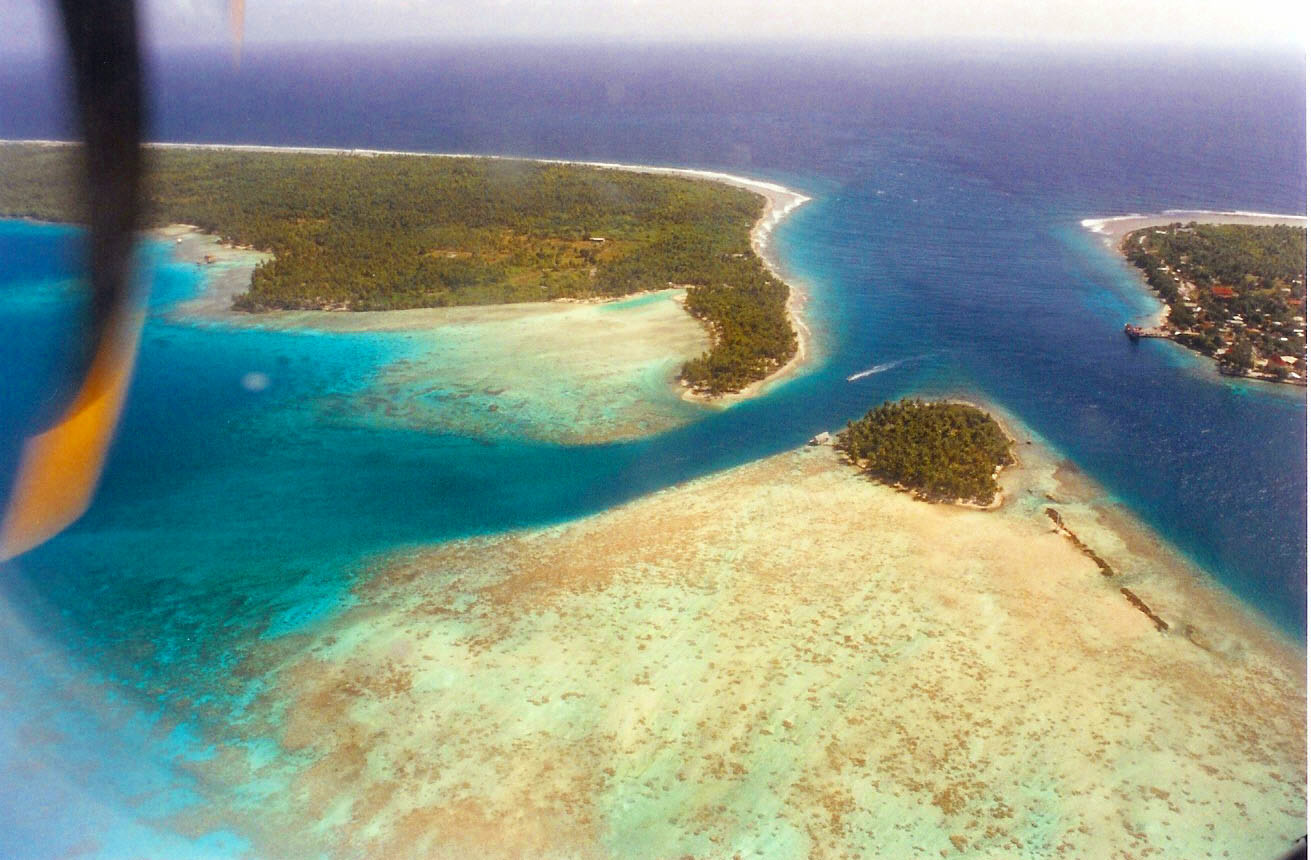
Avatoru Pass with Motu Fara, a private island

Avatoru Pass is located on the northwestern portion of the Rangiroa lagoon in the Tuamotu Islands of French Polynesia. It is located immediately to the West of the village of Avatoru. There are only two major passes on Rangiroa, the other being Tiputa Pass. The latter is located approximately 8 kilometres (5.0 mi) southeast of Avatoru Pass. The pass is a popular scuba diving location, although the Tiputa Pass is generally preferred by divers.

There is a small island located at the mouth of the Pass, called Motu Fara, with an area of 4 acres (16,000 m^{2}).

The small island, which is private and can be rented out, is featured on the 1978 album cover for Pacific by Haruomi Hosono, Shigeru Suzuki and Tatsuro Yamashita.

== See also ==
- Tiputa Pass
