= Krusenstern Island =

Krusenstern Island (and similar names) is a toponym honoring the Baltic German explorer Adam Johann von Krusenstern (1770–1846). It may refer to a number of places in the Pacific Ocean:

- Little Diomede Island (Inupiaq: Iŋaliq), Alaska, United States
- Ailuk Atoll, Marshall Islands
- Tikehau, Tuamotu Archipelago in French Polynesia
- Krusenstern Islands, a small group of islands in the Middendorff Bay
- Krusenstern Island" or "Krusenstern Reef," a phantom island in the Northwestern Hawaiian Islands

== See also ==
- Krusenstern (disambiguation)
