= Krusenstern Strait =

Strait in Kuril Islands, Russia

Coordinates: 48°23′N 153°33′E

Krusenstern Strait (Russian: Пролив Крузенштерна) is a strait that separates the islands of Raikoke and Shiashkotan in the Kuril Islands, Russia. It is separated into two passages by the Lovushki Rocks and is 61.2 km (about 38 mi) wide. A strong northwest tidal current creates tide rips; eddies and whirlpools may also form at times.

This strait was named after Russian admiral and explorer Adam Johann von Krusenstern.
