= Rangiroa =

Atoll in French Polynesia

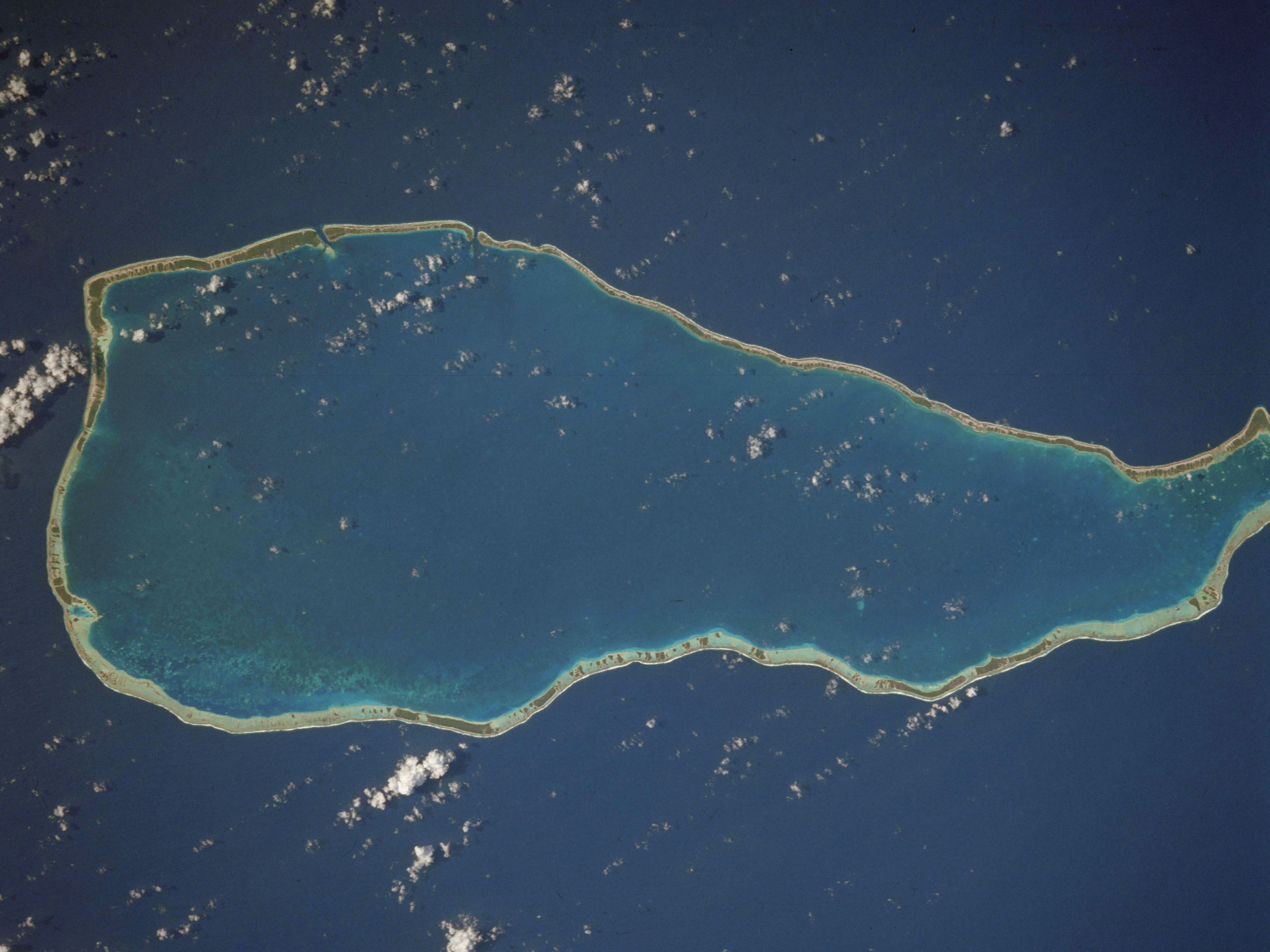
- NASA picture of Rangiroa Atoll

- Location within French Polynesia

Geography
- Location: Pacific Ocean
- Coordinates: 15°07′31″S 147°38′43″W
- Archipelago: Tuamotus
- Total islands: 415
- Area: 1,446 km^{2} (558 sq mi) (lagoon); 79 km^{2} (31 sq mi) (above water)
- Length: 80 km (50 mi)
- Width: 32 km (19.9 mi)
- Highest elevation: 12 m (39 ft)
- Highest point: (unnamed)

Administration
- (France) French Republic
- Overseas collectivity: French Polynesia
- Administrative subdivision: Tuamotus
- Commune: Rangiroa
- Capital city: Avatoru
- Largest settlement: Tiputa (pop. 817)

Demographics
- Population: 2,567 (2012)

Rangiroa (Tuamotuan for 'vast sky') or Te Kokōta (Cook Islands Māori for 'the Hyades star cluster') is the largest atoll in the Tuamotus and one of the largest in the world (smaller than Kwajalein in the Marshall Islands and Huvadhu in the Maldives).

It is in French Polynesia and is part of the Palliser group. The nearest atoll is Tikehau, 12 kilometres (7.5 mi) to the west. It is about 355 km (221 mi) northeast of Tahiti. Rangiroa is home to about 2,500 people on almost 80 km^{2} (31 sq mi). The chief town is Avatoru, in the atoll's northwest.

== Geography and environment ==
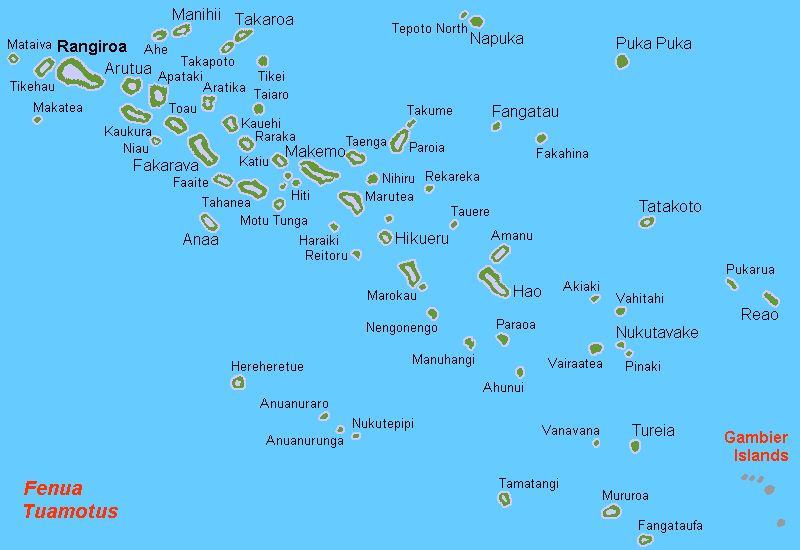
Location of Rangiroa in French Polynesia

The atoll consists of about 415 motus, islets and sandbars comprising a total land area of about 170 km^{2} (66 sq mi). There are approximately one hundred narrow passages (straits or passes), called hoa, in the fringing reef. The atoll has a flattened elliptic shape, with 80 km (50 mi) in length and a width ranging from 5–32 km (3.1–19.9 mi). The width of land reaches 300–500 m (980–1,640 ft) wide and its circumference totals up to 200 km (120 mi). The lagoon has a maximum depth of 35 m (115 ft) and its surface is 1,446 km^{2} (558 sq mi). (Note: All figures approximate) It is so large that it has its own horizon. Due to its shallow depth, the currents that come in and out through the passes, together with the winds, can sometimes create interior storms.

Because of their large size, and the existence of only two passes, each high tide creates a strong incoming current, while each low tide creates a strong outgoing current within the two passes. While flowing inward through Tiputa Pass, nearly 200 individual sharks will gather at the entrance to the pass, at a depth of 50 meters (160 ft). Led by the strong current, sharks can remain motionless. Divers are able to observe them without difficulty. Large manta ray, green sea turtle, and humphead wrasse are also seen. During summer (December-March), tiger and hammerhead shark are present. In January, large numbers of stingray gather in the Tiputa Pass, as do the hammerheads that feed on them.

=== Water and ecological problems ===
Like many atolls, Rangiroa has no permanent fresh waterbodies, and therefore no central water distribution system. Each household must collect and store rainwater in cisterns. As a result of excessive pumping, the freshwater lenses that form on the coral reefs are now mostly brackish water, leading to saltwater intrusion.

Some are additionally polluted by landfill. As atolls form on the surface of the ocean, freshwater supplies are contaminated by the burial of waste, often accumulated in unregulated dumps or buried only a few meters deep. Such problems of water supply and waste management are common on atolls with the adoption of contemporary living conditions, and are therefore structural, as in the case of Rangiroa.

In addition to this inherent problem, the progress of global warming and the consequent rise in sea levels threaten the island. In common with other atolls, Rangiroa's ecology and its viability as a permanent habitation for humans are based on a highly vulnerable ecosystem that is delicately balanced, so requiring careful resource management.

== History ==
It is believed the first settlers arrived on Rangiroa around the 10th century AD. The first recorded Europeans to arrive on Rangiroa were Dutch explorers Jacob le Maire and Willem Schouten during their 1615-1616 Pacific journey. They called this atoll, Vlieghen Eiland, or 'Island of Flies', because their landing party returned to the ship covered in black flies. Rangiroa appears in some maps as Nairsa or as Dean's island. John Byron, passing the atoll during his circumnavigation in 1765, named it for the Prince of Wales. This atoll was visited by the Charles Wilkes expedition on 7 September 1839.

During the 1950s, the economy of Rangiroa was driven by fishing and the production of copra. The inauguration of the Rangiroa Airport in 1965 allowed rapid development of the tourism industry as underwater diving facilities and hotels were built.

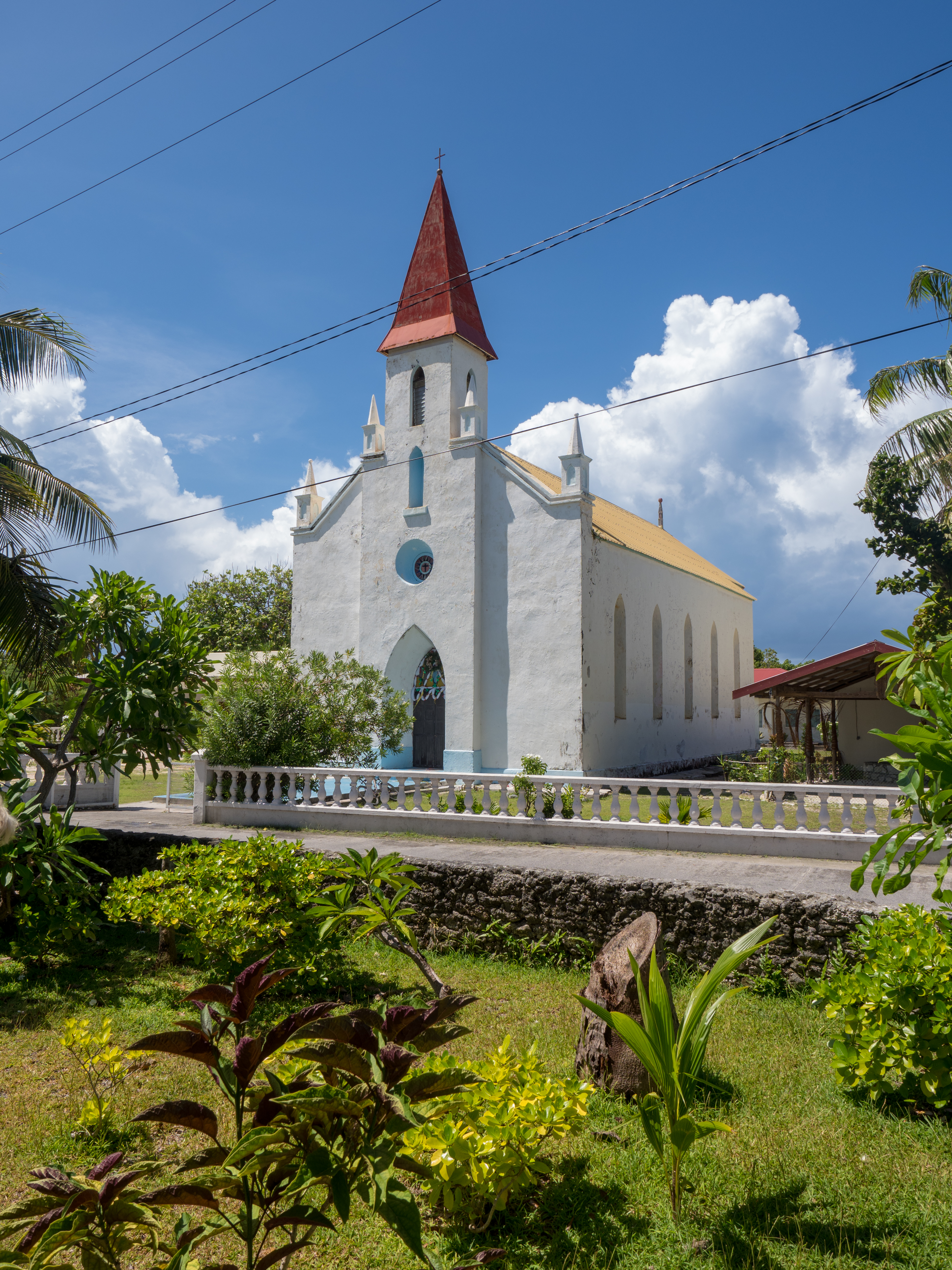
Church of Our Lady of Peace (Église de Notre-Dame-de-Paix) in Tiputa

== Administration ==
The atoll of Rangiroa is the chef-lieu of the commune of Rangiroa, which consists of two other atolls (Tikehau and Mataiva) and a separate non-atoll island (Makatea).

== Demography ==
Only two islands, at the northern end of the atoll, are permanently inhabited. As of 2007, the total population on the atoll of Rangiroa was 2,473 inhabitants. The main villages are Avatoru (pop. 817), Tiputa (pop. 971), Ohutu (pop. 546), Taeo'o, Fenuaroa, Otepipi and Tevaro. Both Avatoru and Tiputa were built on neighboring islands, 12.5 and 4 km (7.8–2.5 mi) in length respectively. They are separated by the major Tiputa Pass. The other major pass of the atoll is Avatoru Pass, immediately to the west of the island of Avatoru.

=== Religion ===
As in the rest of the Tuamotu Islands, the majority of the inhabitants are Christians, as a consequence of missionary activity by both Catholic and Protestant groups. The Catholic Church administers 3 religious buildings on the atoll: the Church of St. Michael in Avatoru (Église de Saint-Michel), the Chapel of St. Anne in Otepipi (Chapelle de Sainte-Anne), and the Church of Our Lady of Peace in Tiputa (Église de Notre-Dame-de-Paix), all under the Archdiocese of Papeete based on the Island of Tahiti.

== Economy ==
=== Pearls ===
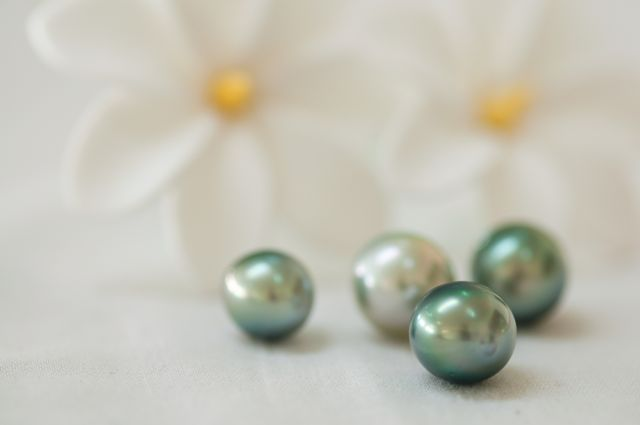
Tahitian pearls in the pearl farm of Rangiroa

The breeding of pearl oysters in the lagoon can produce black pearls. Black pearls (meaning the marine cultured pearls produced from the black lip pearl oyster shell, Pinctada margaritifera) are abundant in the atolls of French Polynesia. These pearls, which have a wide range of natural colours, from white to dark and all shades of grey, are the only cultured pearls in the world with so many different natural colours as the famous green rose peacock.

The technique to produce marine cultured pearls was developed in Japan and, except some minor details, is similar in French Polynesia. A mother of pearl bead is inserted in the animal together with a piece of tissue (mantle) taken from another pearl oyster. The piece of tissue, as a graft tissue, will develop quickly and will form a skin around the bead and then will deposit mother of pearl on the surface of the bead. Bead rejection is important and concern about 30 percent of the seeded shells, mainly because the graft tissue is not close enough to the bead. Even with perfectly round beads, only 20 percent of the pearls will be perfectly round at the harvest, about two years after the seeding.

Pearl farming is done in more than 30 atolls of French Polynesia and is the main activity for numerous families in the Tuamotu archipelago. In Rangiroa, a few farms exploited about 1,000 acres (4.0 km^{2}) of water surface in the lagoon loaned by the Tahitian government. The biggest farm, Gauguin's Pearl employed more than 50 local workers, with a strong impact on the economy of this 2,000 person atoll. A school dedicated to the pearl farming techniques and a research centre on pearl oysters are also implanted on the atoll of Rangiroa, which make it a kind of pearl centre for this industry.

=== Fishing ===
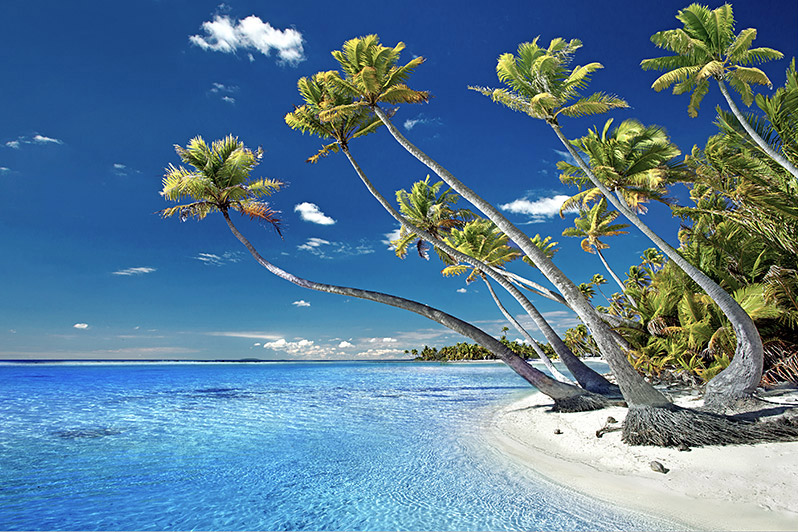
One uninhabited islet or motu in the Atoll

Essentially a part of food production, however, it is also exported to the island of Tahiti.

=== Viticulture ===
The atoll of Rangiroa is also known for its vineyards, which are unique in the world. The vines grow on the edge of a lagoon beside coconuts, and produce two harvests per year. The winery is in the heart of the village of Avatoru. The grapes are brought to the winery by boat.

The creation of this vineyard came after much prior analysis, to find the best site capable of hosting the vines. The first vines were imported in 1992 and underwent tests for acclimatization and selection in the main islands of Polynesia, with the uncertainty of their adaptation to climate. Thirty varieties were imported from various parts of Europe. The vineyard is Domaine Dominique Auroy.

The tests took place in:

- The Austral Islands on the high Rurutu and Tubuai,
- Nuku Hiva (Marquesas archipelago),
- Rangiroa (Tuamotu archipelago),
- The plains and mountains of Tahiti.

The atoll of Rangiroa was selected for the following reasons: absence of grapevine pest such as defoliating insects (e.g., Grape Phylloxera) and its proximity to Tahiti. The varietals grown on the atoll include Carignan, Italia and Black Muscat.

=== Tourism ===
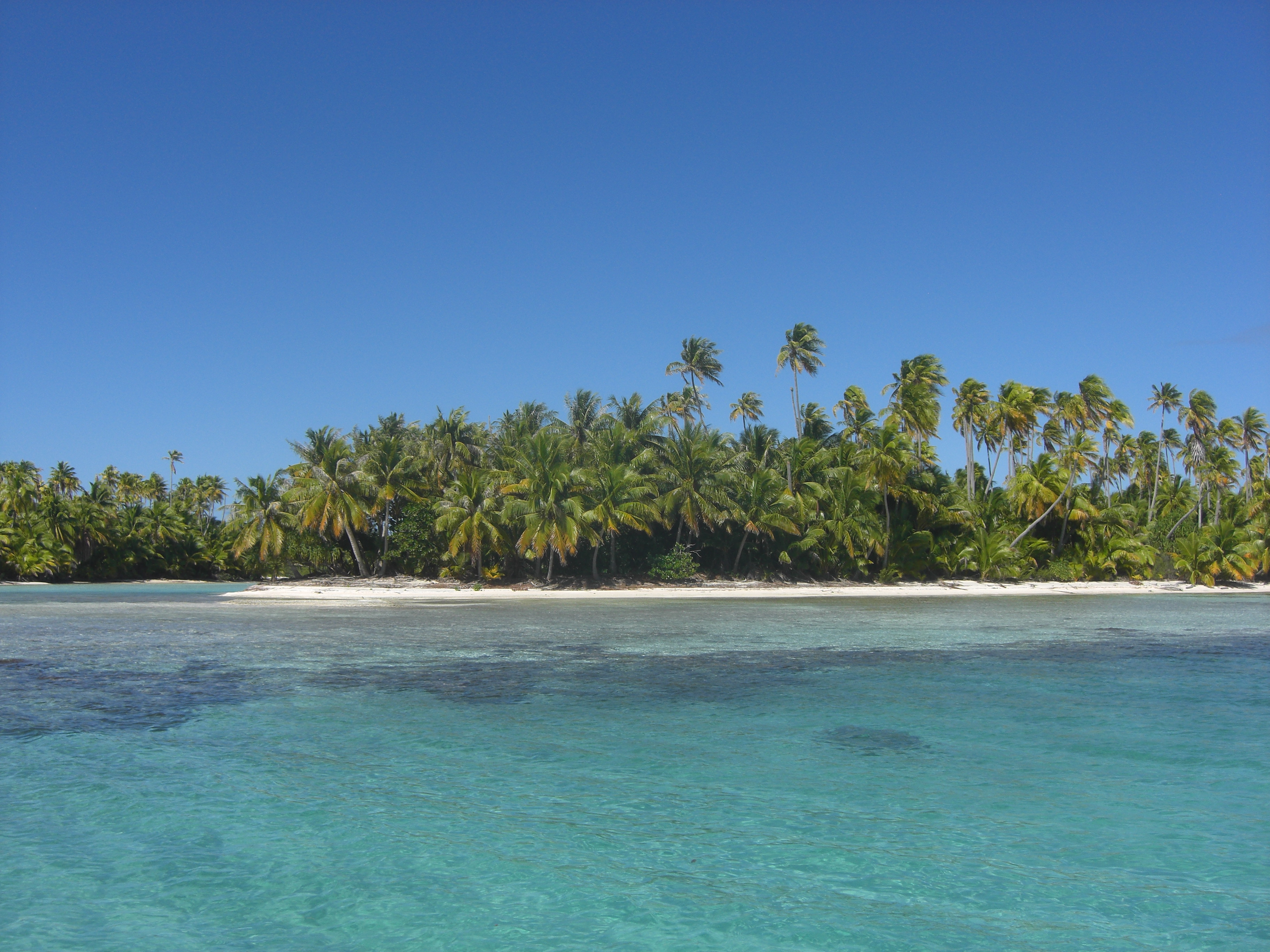
A beach in Rangiroa

Tourism is a major economic activity of the island: daily connections with Tahiti, an exceptional lagoon and passes which are good sites for scuba diving attract a steady number of tourists. These are accommodated in hotels and family-run guesthouses, a small number of which exist on the island.

==== Scuba diving ====
Rangiroa is a major underwater diving destination because of the lagoon's clear waters and diverse marine fauna. There are several highly-regarded and popular diving sites, particularly in and around the Tiputa Pass, which runs 3.5 km (2.2 mi) to the Avatoru Pass. Sedentary common bottlenose dolphins (Tursiops truncatus) are regularly seen at group play in the pass. Many forms of marine life are present in the atoll's waters, providing opportunities for observation to divers and snorkellers.

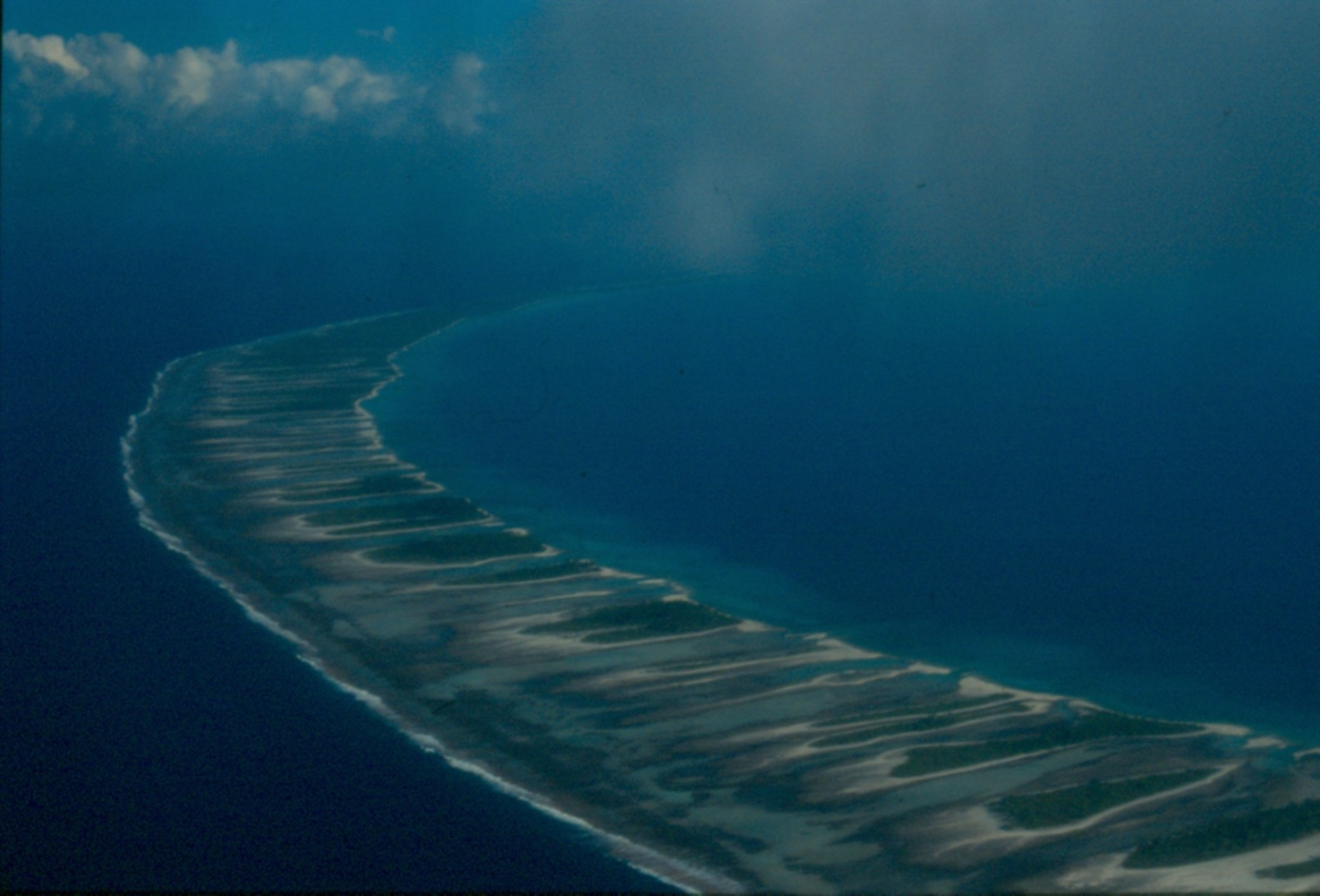
Western part of Rangiroa atoll

Popular diving sites are the Blue Lagoon, Avatoru Pass, Tiputa Pass, and Les Sables Roses ('the pink sands'). A notable site in the atoll is the Blue Lagoon, which is a smaller lagoon formed on the southwestern edge of Rangiroa. Its shallow waters accentuate the bright blue color of the water. Les Sables Roses are sandbars of pink sand located on the southeastern portion of Rangiroa.

==== Transportation ====
Air transportation is available from and to Rangiroa Airport, located on the main motu of Avatoru. There are flights to Tahiti and other atolls of French Polynesia.

== See also ==
- Effects of climate change on island nations
- Polynesian languages
- French Polynesia
- Tiputa Pass
