= Makatea =

Atoll in French Polynesia

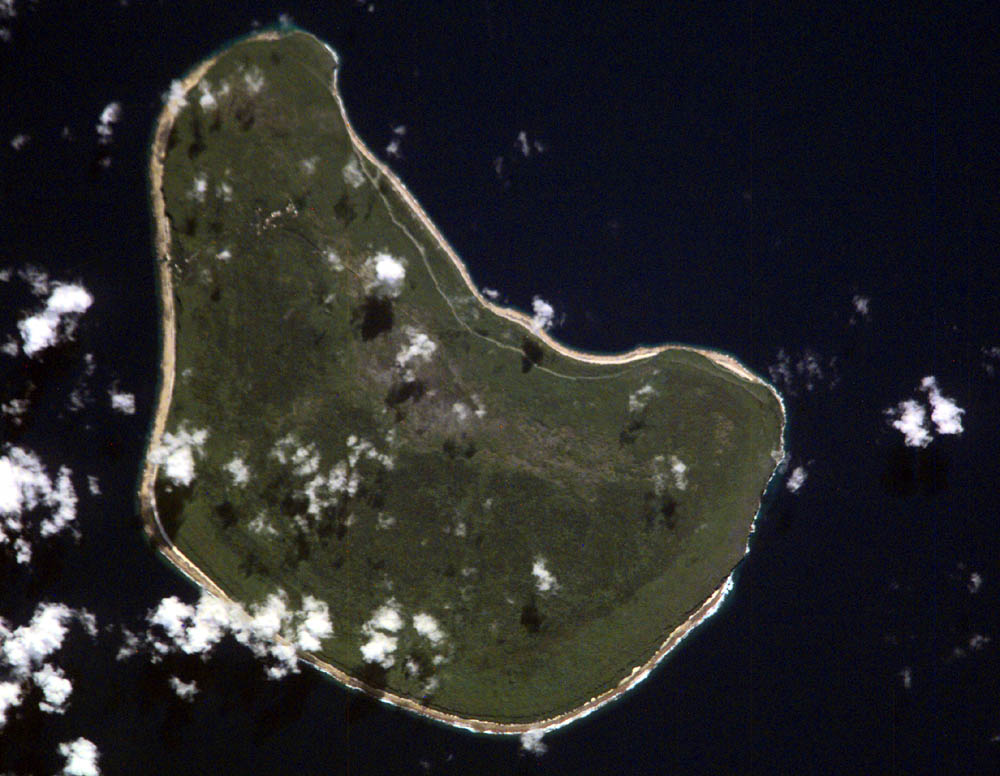
- NASA picture of Makatea Atoll

- Location within French Polynesia Location within Oceania Location within Pacific Ocean

Geography
- Location: Pacific Ocean
- Coordinates: 15°51′S 148°15′W
- Archipelago: Tuamotus
- Area: 24 km^{2} (9.3 sq mi)
- Length: 7.5 km (4.66 mi)
- Width: 7 km (4.3 mi)

Administration
- France
- Overseas collectivity: French Polynesia
- Administrative subdivision: Tuamotus
- Commune: Rangiroa
- Largest settlement: Moumu

Demographics
- Population: 68 (2012)

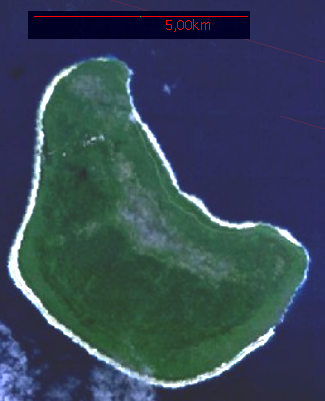
Satellite Image of Makatea Island

Makatea, or Mangaia-te-vai-tamae, is a raised coral atoll in the northwestern part of the Tuamotus, which is a part of the French overseas collectivity of French Polynesia. It is located 79 kilometres (49 mi) southwest from Rangiroa to the west of the Palliser group, which also is in French Polynesia. Makatea is surrounded by spectacular cliffs, rising to a plateau 80 metres (260 ft) above sea level. This island is 7.5 kilometres (4.7 mi) long, with a maximum width of 7 kilometres (4.3 mi) in the south. It is 24 square kilometres (9.3 sq mi) in area. Makatea is one of only four islands of the Tuamotu Archipelago (along with filled atolls Nukutavake, Tikei, and Tepoto Nord) that do not take the form of a typical atoll.

== Geography ==
Makatea is an uplifted atoll in French Polynesia and should not be confused with the term “makatea island,” which refers to a composite island type. The island is crescent-shaped and composed of carbonate rock, measuring to about 7 km in length and 4.5 km in width. Its northern and eastern coasts are characterized by steep cliffs rising 60 to 75 meters, while the southern coast slopes more gradually and feature two lower terraces ranging between 5 and 20 meters in height.

=== Geological history ===
During the Miocene, Makatea formed as an atoll-like platform built upon a pre-existing reef structure, and its lagoon gradually infilled with sediment over time. Periods of emergence led to the formation of karstic cavities that were later infilled with phosphate deposits, which are thought to have originated from weathered volcanic material transported from nearby volcanic islands.

== History ==
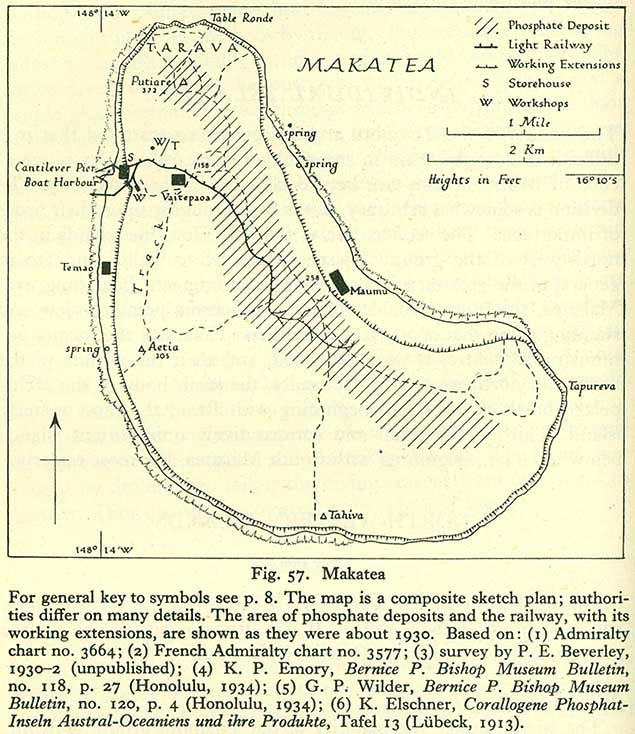
Map of Makatea

Makatea is one of the only Paumotuan islands with potable water. Its native name derived from the drinking water being brought out of its dark caves by the local people. "Mā," pure, clear; used here to mean water, "Atea," light of day and "K" for euphony. The other name of the Island was Mangaia-te-vai-tamāe, meaning "Mangaia of the purified (or clear) water."

The island was called "Sagitario" in 1606 by Pedro Fernandes de Queirós who led a Spanish expedition to Terra Australis from Peru. Over a century later it was named "Aurora" by Dutch mariner Jakob Roggeveen in 1722. Later, the Polynesians called it "Papa Tea" (which means "white rock").

There is a ghost town, Vaitepaua, and an adjacent abandoned port, Temao, on the northwest coast of Makatea. These are from the times of phosphate mining (1917 to 1964). Makatea is one of three important Pacific raised coral islands that had large phosphate deposits, the other two being Nauru and Banaba. The Pacific Phosphate Company Ltd, (PPC), which was founded by John T. Arundel and involved in mining at Nauru and Banaba, formed the Compagnie des Phosphates de l'Océanie with a Tahitian syndicate to mine phosphate on Makatea. In September 1909, Ocean Queen, a ship owned by the PPC, was wrecked on the reef at Makatea; a bent connecting rod caused the engines to stop and the current carried the ship onto the reef.

During World War II, Cook Islanders were sent to the French Polynesian island of Makatea to maintain New Zealand's phosphate supplies for agriculture. The scheme followed the loss of access to phosphate-rich islands from Japanese forces. Makatea, still under Allied control and safely distant from Japanese advances, became an alternative source of phosphate essential for New Zealand's farming. Phosphate mining drew hundreds of people to Makatea in the years before the French Centre d'Experimentation du Pacifique (CEP) started nuclear experiments. Mining operations continued after the war with approximately 3,000 labor contracts signed. For many workers, wages earned in Makatea's phosphate industry was used to support their families' migration to New Zealand. For over two decades or even longer, Makatea was a very active little island because of the ships arriving to load phosphate and to bring supplies and food to the many workers and their families that lived there. After the end of the phosphate exploitation, Makatea was almost totally left on its own with only a few families left to guard the island.

The mining produced thousands of hand-dug holes across the upper plateau of Makatea. Each cylindrical hole is about 2.4 metres (7 ft 10 in) in diameter and 15 metres (49 ft) to 23 metres (75 ft) in depth. One of the deepest, called "the pothole", located under the windmill, is 80 metres (260 ft) deep and reaches the water table. An unsuspecting visitor could easily fall into a hole and die while walking in the thick undergrowth that hides these holes. The once active village where the miners lived had a school, bakery, first-aid medical centre, and all the things needed to make life comfortable. All that remains today has been destroyed by time and nature. The school and other places have been levelled to the ground and grown over by vines and jungle.

In early 2022, the French Polynesian government was reported to have agreed to a further study of Makatea atoll in response to an application by a New Zealand company seeking to resume phosphate mining.

In February 1956 the United States submarine Caiman en route from Tahiti to Nuka Hiva in the Marquesas encountered the MV Nasarada, under Capt Oto Orbeck, in distress several miles from Makatea at about 05:00hrs. The vessel had nine persons and six pigs on board. Unable to repair the engine, USS Caiman towed the Nasarada to Pearl Harbor, and subsequently requested permission to enter the harbor at Makatea. Permission was denied by the French. The submarine towed the Nasarada to the harbor entrance and proceeded on to the Marquesas.

== Administration and demography ==
Makatea Island is an associated commune within the commune of Rangiroa, with a population of 95 (2022 census). The main village is called Moumu. The islanders live off agriculture, culture of copra, some fishing and the trade of coconut crabs.

== Wildlife ==
Makatea is the only home to endemic birds, the Polynesian imperial pigeon, Ducula aurorae aurorae (status Endangered), and the Makatea fruit dove (status Vulnerable), and formerly a range of endodontid land snails.

== Flag ==
Flag of Makatea

The symbolism of the 2:1:2 horizontal triband is as follows: The top stripe is light blue and represents the sky, the white middle stripe represents the name White Rock (papa tea in Tahitian) and the bottom stripe is deep blue symbolizing the sea that surrounds the island. The red star singles out Makatea within the Tuamotu Archipelago, with its 16 blue-starred flag, and is a 'rocky' allusion to the symbolism of the middle stripe, uniting sky and sea and completing a red-white-blue reference to the French flag. Mayor Julien Maï of Makatea and vexillographer Colin Randall of Australia designed the flag.

== See also ==
- French Polynesia
- Raised coral atoll
