= Avatoru =

- Town
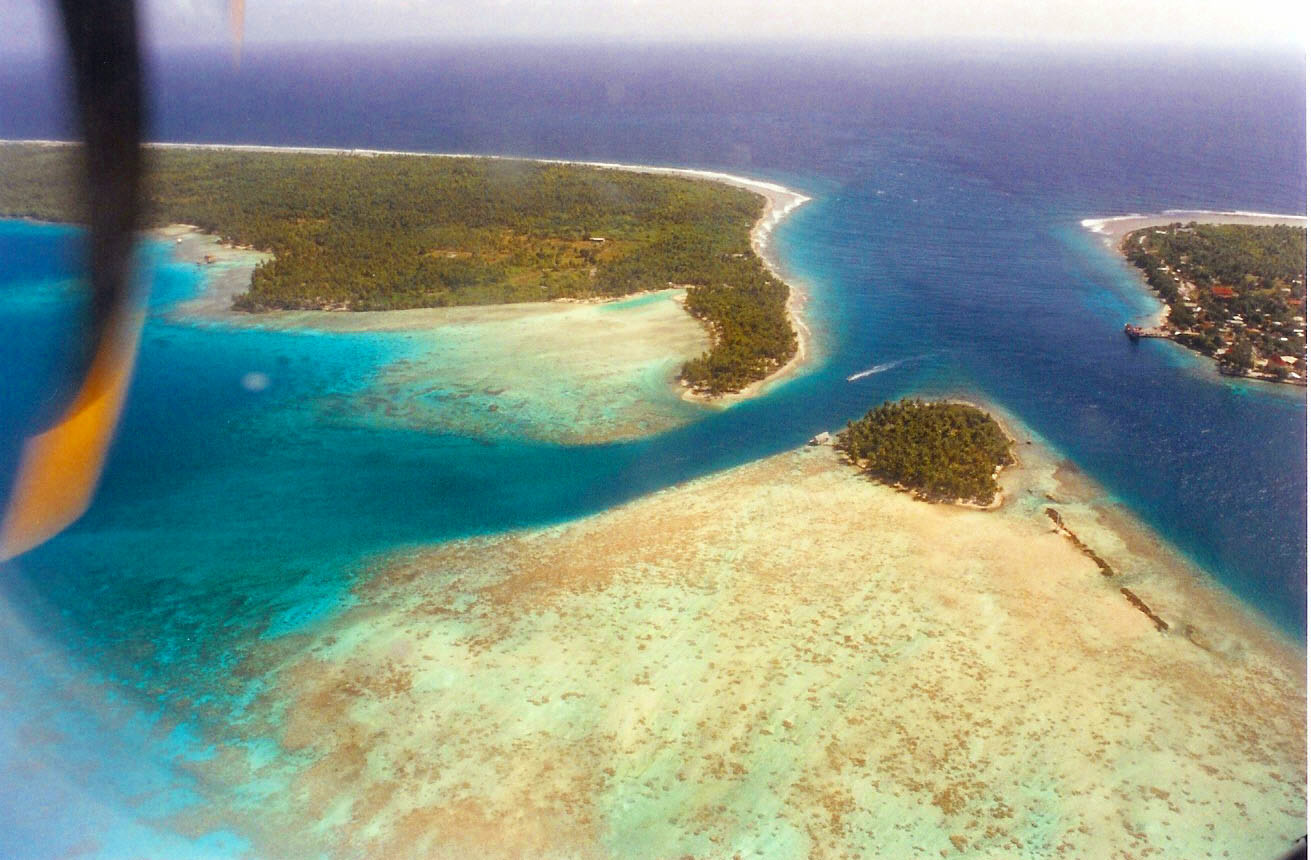
- Interactive map of Avatoru
- Country: France
- Overseas collectivity: French Polynesia
- Administrative subdivision: Îles Tuamotu-Gambier
- Commune: Rangiroa

Avatoru is the chief town of Rangiroa, a coral atoll in the Tuamotu Archipelago.

It is located in the northwestern part of the atoll, and is home to the atoll's administration buildings, its post office and several churches. Rangiroa Airport is located 5.5 km southeast of Avatoru. The atoll's black pearl industry is centered here as well. Its population is approximately 700.

It is one of two villages located on Rangiroa, the other being Tiputa, located approximately 7 km southeast of Avatoru.

== See also ==
- Avatoru Pass
- French Polynesia
