= Tuamotu tropical moist forests =

Terrestrial ecoregion in French Polynesia and the Pitcairn Islands

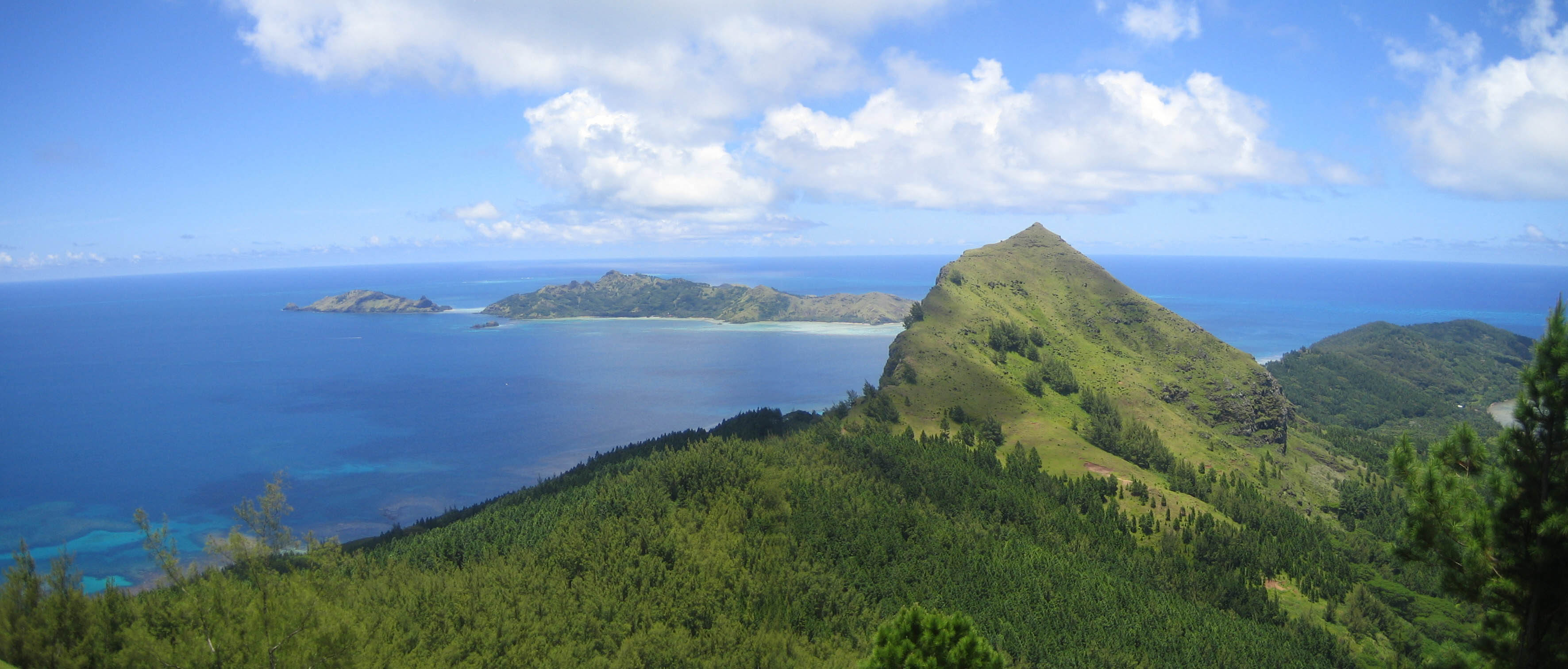
- Mont Mokoto on Mangareva

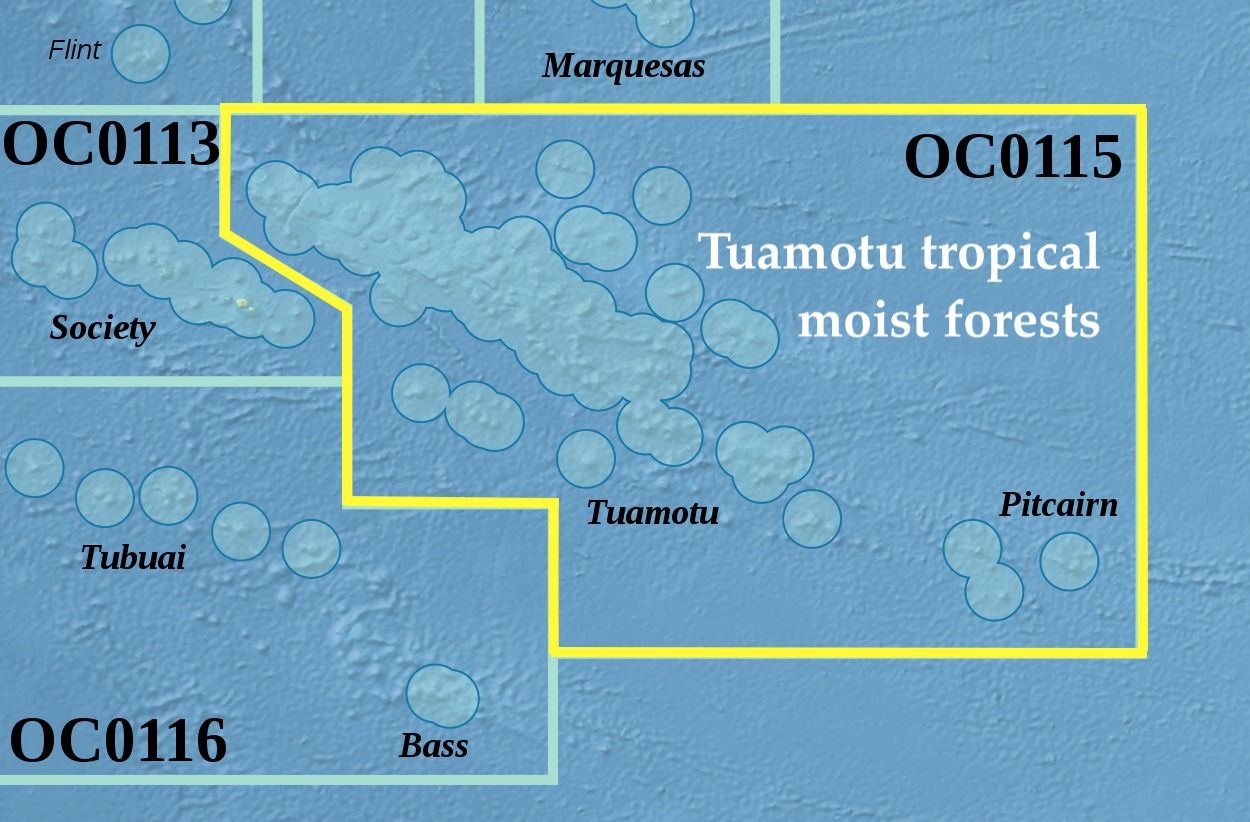
- Map of the Tuamotu tropical moist forests ecoregion

Ecology
- Realm: Oceanian
- Biome: tropical and subtropical moist broadleaf forests

Geography
- Area: 777 km^{2} (300 sq mi)
- Countries: French Polynesia; Pitcairn Islands
- Administrative subdivisions: Îles Tuamotu-Gambier

Conservation
- Conservation status: Critical/endangered
- Protected: 38 km^{2} (5%)

The Tuamotu tropical moist forests is a tropical and subtropical moist broadleaf forests ecoregion in the Tuamotu Archipelago of French Polynesia and the Pitcairn Islands.

== Geography ==
The ecoregion includes the 76 atolls and islands of the Tuamotu Archipelago and Gambier Islands, which stretch 1,800 km from northwest to southeast through French Polynesia, as well as the Pitcairn Islands, four islands 1,000 km further southeast which are a self-governing British overseas territory. The islands extend from 13º to 25º S latitude and from 124º to 149º W longitude.

The Tuamotus are mostly low coral atolls, with the exception of Makatea, which is made of coralline limestone raised 100 meters above sea level by tectonic activity. The Gambier Islands are mostly high volcanic islands, with Mangareva reaching 435 meters elevation.

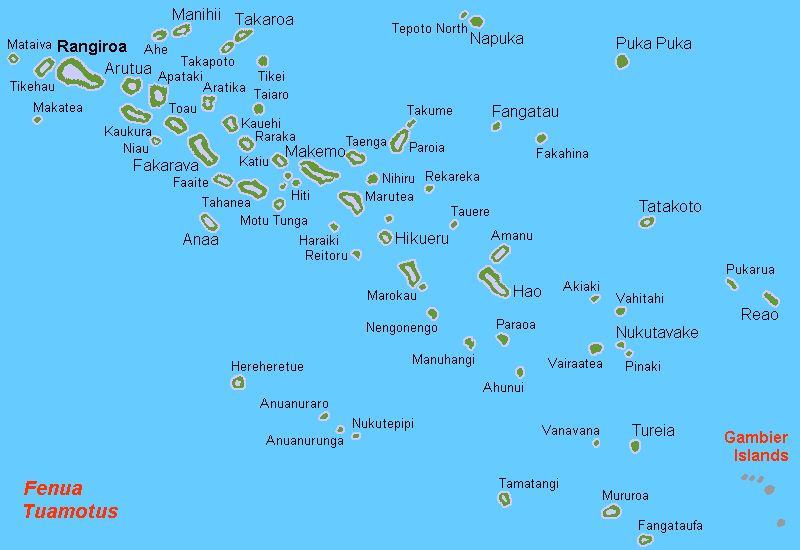
Map of the Tuamotu and Gambier islands

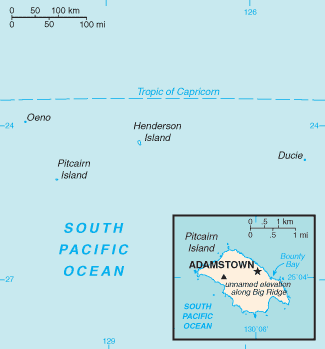
Map of the Pitcairn Islands

Pitcairn Island is a volcanic island that reaches 350 meters elevation. Henderson is a raised limestone plateau. The other Pitcairn Islands, Ducie and Oeno, are atolls.

== Climate ==
The climate ranges from tropical in the northern Tuamotus, with a mean annual temperature of 27 °C to subtropical in the Pitcairn Islands, which have a mean annual temperature of 23 °C. Average annual rainfall is generally between 1,500 and 2,000 mm, with more rainfall on the windward eastern slopes of the high islands from easterly trade winds.

== Flora ==
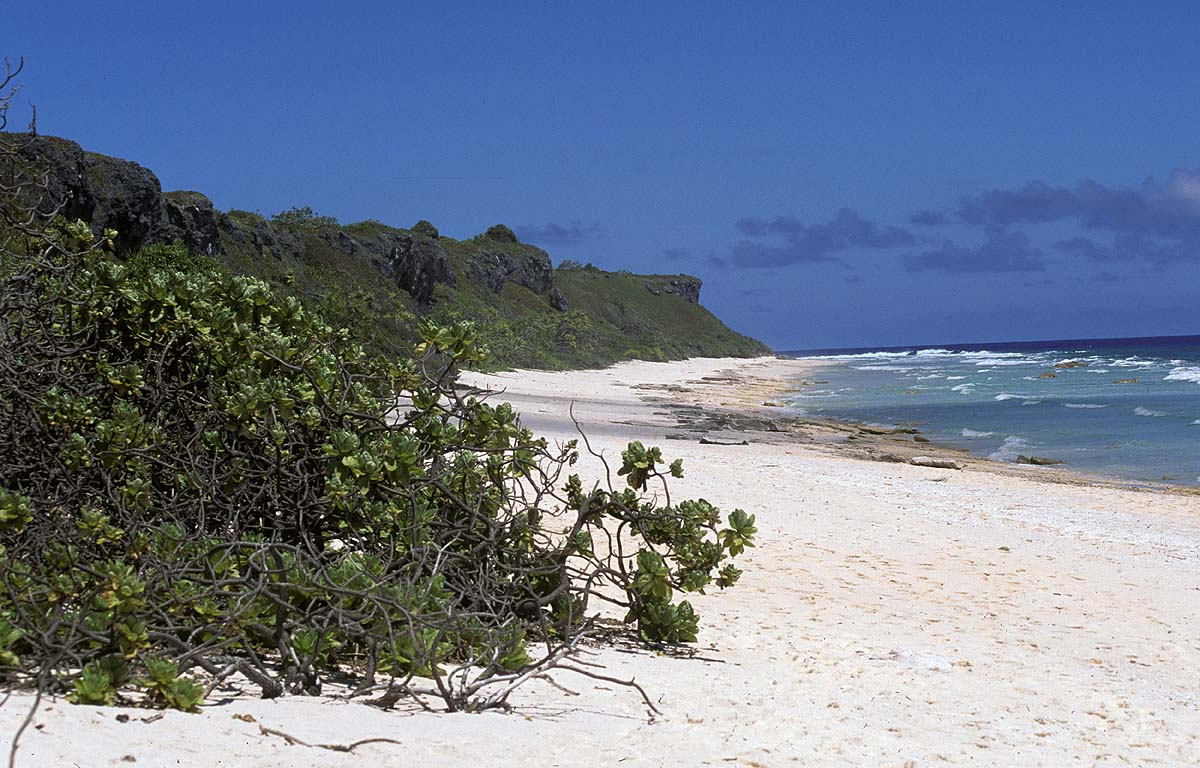
Tournefortia argentea growing along the beach on Henderson Island.

The natural vegetation of the islands is mostly tropical moist forest.

Broadleaf strand forests are the typical vegetation on atolls and the lowlands of the high islands. The shrubs Suriana maritima or Pemphis acidula grow in sandy areas near the beach. Scaevola spp. and Guettarda speciosa grow between the shore shrubs and Tournefortia argentea forest. The forest grows more diverse inland, and includes Pisonia grandis, Pandanus tectorius, Pipturus argenteus, Sesbania coccinea, Cordia subcordata, Morinda citrifolia, and Calophyllum inophyllum. Myrsine niauensis is endemic to Niau atoll.

The coastal plateaus of uplifted coralline limestone are home to a tall and dense forest of Pisonia grandis, Pandanus tectorius, Ficus prolixa, Homalium mouo, Guettarda speciosa, and, on Makatea, the endemic palm Pritchardia vuylstekeana. The plateau forest on Henderson also includes Thespesia populnea, Bidens hendersonensis, Celtis sp., Nesoluma st-johnianum, and Geniostoma hendersonense.

The higher-elevation interior forests on Pitcairn are characterized by the trees Homalium mouo, Metrosideros collina, Ficus prolixa, Pandanus tectorius, and Thespesia populnea.

Approximately 14 of the vascular plant species on both Henderson and Pitcairn Islands are endemic.

Pitcairn has 80 species of native vascular plants, which include two endemic ferns and eight endemic vascular plants. 51 of the native vascular plants are considered threatened. Coprosma benefica and the endemic fern Angiopteris chauliodonta have very small populations, and over-harvesting by islanders has caused Cyclophyllum barbatum and Psydrax odoratum to dwindle in numbers. The lack of fruit-eating birds on Pitcairn has limited the dispersal of C. benfica, P. odoratum, and Xylosma suaveolens, decreasing these plants' ability to recover from disturbance.

== Fauna ==
The Tuamotus are home to six endemic bird species, and the Pitcairn Islands support five endemic species.

The endemic Polynesian pigeon (Ducula aurorae), Makatea fruit dove (Ptilinopus chalcurus) and Tuamotu reed warbler (Acrocephalus atypha) survive in the remaining forests of Makatea. The endemic Tuamotu sandpiper (Prosobonia cancellata) survives on rat-free islands in the archipelago. Other Tuamotu endemics are the atoll fruit dove (Ptilinopus coralensis), which is widespread throughout the archipelago, and the Tuamotu kingfisher (Todiramphus gambieri) which is limited to Niau. The Polynesian ground dove (Alopecoenas erythropterus) once lived in the Society Islands and the Tuamotus, but now survives only in the Tuamotus.

Endemic bird species on Henderson are the Henderson fruit dove (Ptilinopus insularis), Henderson crake (Zapornia atra), Henderson lorikeet (Vini stepheni), and Henderson reed warbler (Acrocephalus taiti). The Pitcairn reed warbler (Acrocephalus vaughani) is endemic to Pitcairn.

The ecoregion is an important breeding ground for many seabirds, including 22 species that breed in the Tuamotus and 14 species in the Gambier and Pitcairn Islands. Henderson island is the last known breeding ground for the ground-nesting Henderson petrel (Pterodroma atrata). Introduced Polynesian rats are the main killer of petrel chicks, and the former breeding colony on Ducie Island was destroyed by introduced rats. The bristle-thighed curlew (Numenius tahitensis) winters in the Tuamotus.

Pitcairn has 26 species of extant land snails, of which eight are endemic. Three species survive in patches of native vegetation smaller than one hectare. These remnant habitats are vulnerable to invasion by exotic plants, like lantana or rose-apple, which would make them unsuitable for the land snails.

Henderson has nine endemic species of land snail and more than 450 arthropod species, including 50 endemics.

== Conservation and threats ==
Polynesian settlers arrived in the Tuamotus about 1300 years ago, likely from the Society Islands. Polynesians brought the coconut palm (Cocos nucifera) and candlenut tree (Aleurites moluccanus) which naturalized on the islands, as well as pigs and the Polynesian rat (Rattus exulans). By 1000 Polynesians had reached the Pitcairn Islands and further east to Rapa Nui. Pitcairn and Henderson were settled by Polynesians, but both islands were abandoned about 500 years ago.

European explorers visited the Tuamotus from the 17th century onwards. By the early 19th century the Tuamotus were subject to the Tahitian kingdom, and in the latter half of the century the Tuamotus were colonized by France when it annexed the kingdom. In 1790, nine British mutineers from HMS Bounty and their Tahitian companions settled on Pitcairn, and with a brief interruption their descendants have lived there since. Europeans introduced the black rat (Rattus rattus), brown rat (Rattus norvegicus), house cats, goats, rabbits, and other animals, along with many of exotic plants.

The introduced rats have decimated the islands' endemic land birds and sea birds, and many of the introduced plants have been invasive, displacing native plants and the animals that depend on them. Much habitat has been destroyed by conversion to agriculture including coconut plantations, overgrazing, and frequent human-caused fires.

Between 1966 and 1996, France conducted 193 nuclear tests on Moruroa and Fangataufa atolls.

Native forests survive on much of Makatea, Niau, and the southeastern Tuamotu atolls. In the Gambier Islands, one patch of native forest survives on Mont Mokota on Mangareva. Henderson's forests are relatively intact, although Polynesian rats have decimated native birds.

== Protected areas ==
A 2017 assessment found that 38 km^{2}, or 5%, of the ecoregion is in protected areas. Protected areas include:

- Commune of Fakarava Biosphere Reserve encompasses seven coral islands and atolls – Fakarava, Aratika, Niau, Kauehi, Raraka, Taiaro, and Toau. A reserve was established on Taiaro in 1972, which became a biosphere UNESCO biosphere reserve in 1977. Six more islands were added to the reserve in 2006. Most are atolls, with low islands of coral sand surrounding a central lagoon. Taiaro completely encloses its hypersaline lagoon, and Niau encloses a brackish lagoon. The reserve preserves atoll and raised limestone coastal forests from 0–6 meters elevation. Niau is home to the sole population of Tuamotu kingfisher. There are 1,575 residents, mostly on Fakarava, and the residents' coconut plantations. Invasive species include Stachytarpheta cayennensis, black rats, and Polynesian rats.
- Henderson Island is a UNESCO World Heritage Site which includes all 3,700 hectares of the island. The world heritage site was created in 1988, and protects relatively intact coastal and raised limestone forest and scrub. Henderson is home to four endemic bird species, along with endemic land snails and arthropods. Polynesian rats, introduced 800 years ago, prey heavily on the chicks of native birds, including the Henderson petrel whose only known breeding ground is on Henderson. A 2011 rodent eradication program dropped poison grain on the island. It was initially successful, reducing the rat population from 800,000 to 60 to 80 individuals, and the Henderson petrel population briefly rebounded. The rats also rebounded, and by 2016 the population was close to pre-eradication levels.
