= Teana (disambiguation) =

Teana can refer to following:

- Teana, a town in Italy
- Teana, a village located in the Fangatau Atoll.
- Nissan Teana, a Japanese car
- Teana Lanster, an anime character
- Teaname, a Coahuiltecan tribe sometimes spelled Teana

== See also ==
- Tiana (disambiguation)
