= Fakarava (commune) =

Commune in French Polynesia, France

- Commune
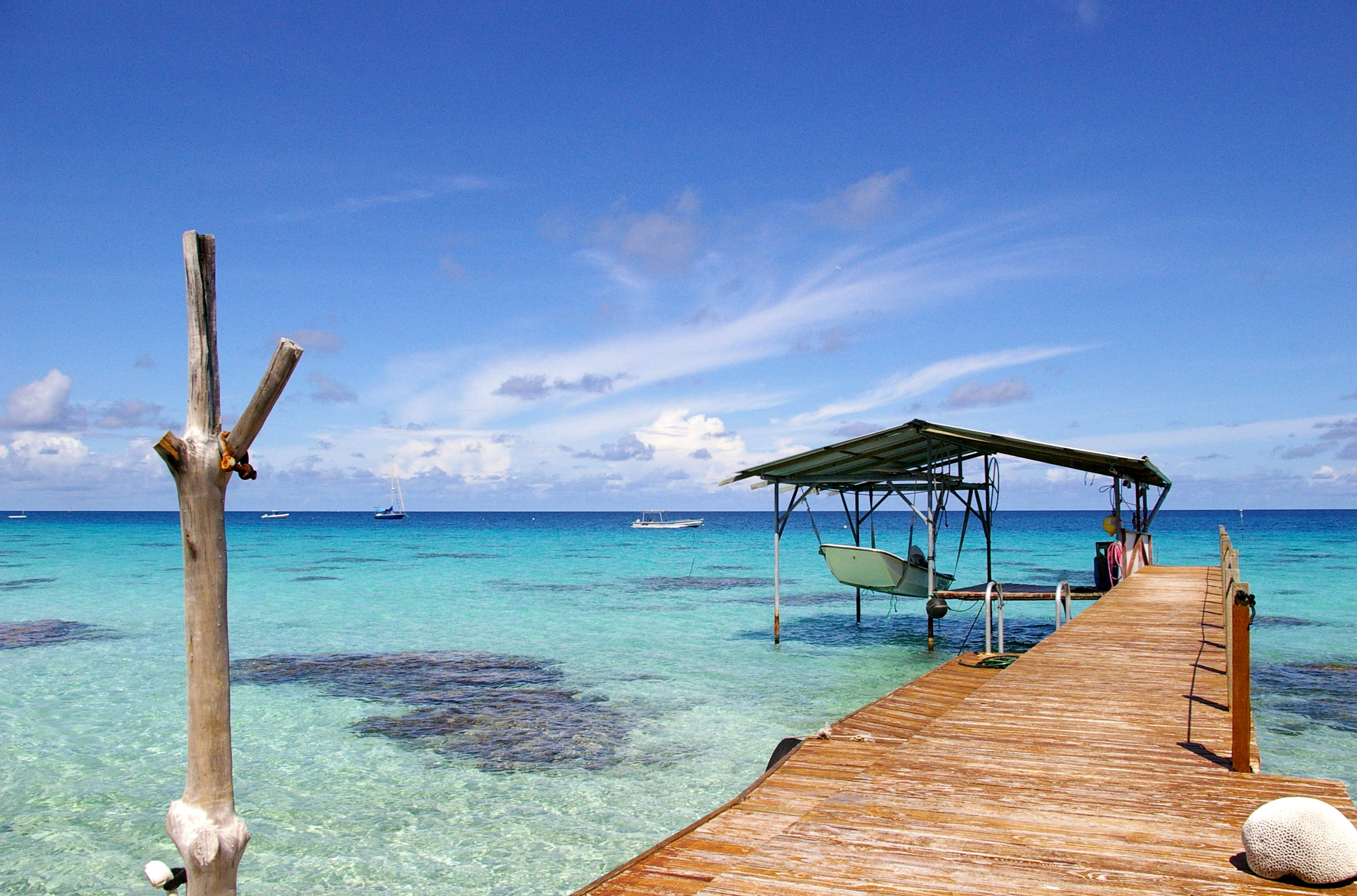
- View of the inner lagoon of Fakarava from Rotoava

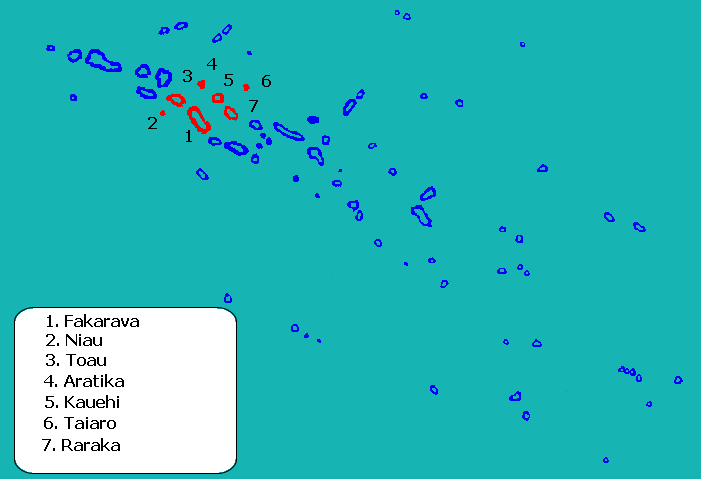
- Location (in red) within the Tuamotu Archipelago
- Location of Fakarava
- Coordinates: 16°03′40″S 145°37′0″W
- Country: France
- Overseas collectivity: French Polynesia
- Subdivision: Îles Tuamotu-Gambier

Government
  - Mayor (2020–2026): Etienne Maro
- Area^{1}: 110.0 km^{2} (42.5 sq mi)
- Highest elevation: 0 m (0 ft)
- Lowest elevation: 0 m (0 ft)
- Population (2022): 1,679
  - Density: 15.26/km^{2} (39.53/sq mi)
- Time zone: UTC−10:00
- INSEE/Postal code: 98716 /
- ^{1} French Land Register data, which excludes lakes, ponds, glaciers > 1 km^{2} (0.386 sq mi or 247 acres) and river estuaries.

Fakarava is a commune of French Polynesia in the archipelago of the Tuamotu Islands. The commune is in the administrative subdivision of the Îles Tuamotu-Gambier. The commune includes seven islands. The chef-lieu is the village Rotoava.

== Geography ==
The commune of Fakarava consists of three associated communes: Fakarava (also including the atoll Toau), Kauehi (also including the atolls Aratika, Raraka and Taiaro) and Niau.

Island	Population 2017	Area (km^{2})	Area of lagoon (km^{2})
Fakarava	830	24.1	1112
Toau	14	12	561
Kauehi	224	16	320
Aratika	225	8.3	145
Raraka	96	14	342
Taiaro	2	16.2	16.2
Niau	246	21.0	53
TOTAL	1637	110.0	2533

== See also ==
- Communes of French Polynesia
