= Niau =

Atoll in French Polynesia

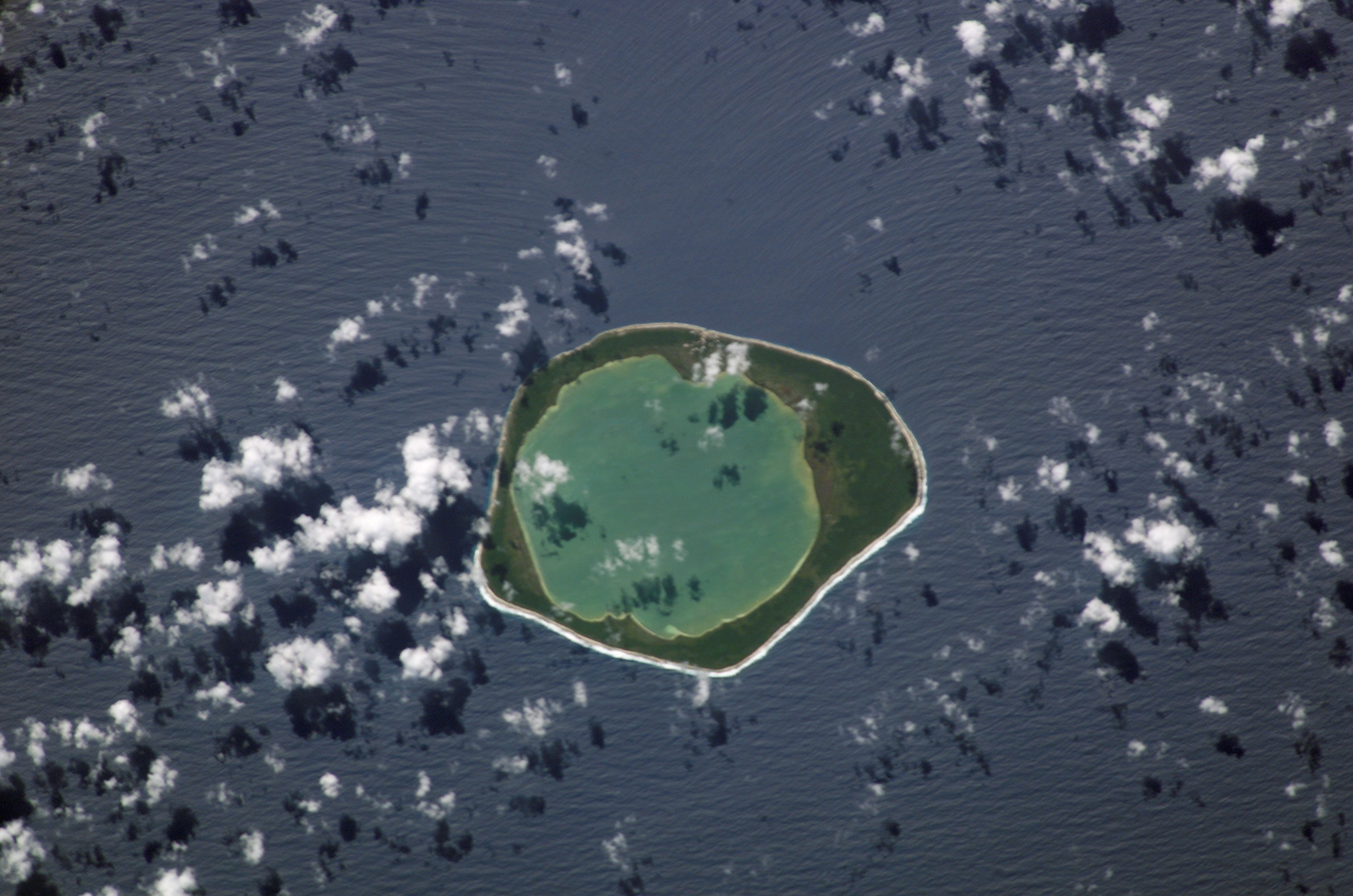
- NASA picture of Niau Atoll

- Location within French Polynesia

Geography
- Location: Pacific Ocean
- Coordinates: 16°9′15″S 146°21′20.4″W
- Archipelago: Tuamotus
- Area: 33 km^{2} (13 sq mi) (lagoon); 20 km^{2} (8 sq mi) (above water)
- Length: 8 km (5 mi)

Administration
- France
- Overseas collectivity: French Polynesia
- Administrative subdivision: Îles Tuamotu-Gambier
- Commune: Fakarava
- Largest settlement: Tupana

Demographics
- Population: 226 (2012)

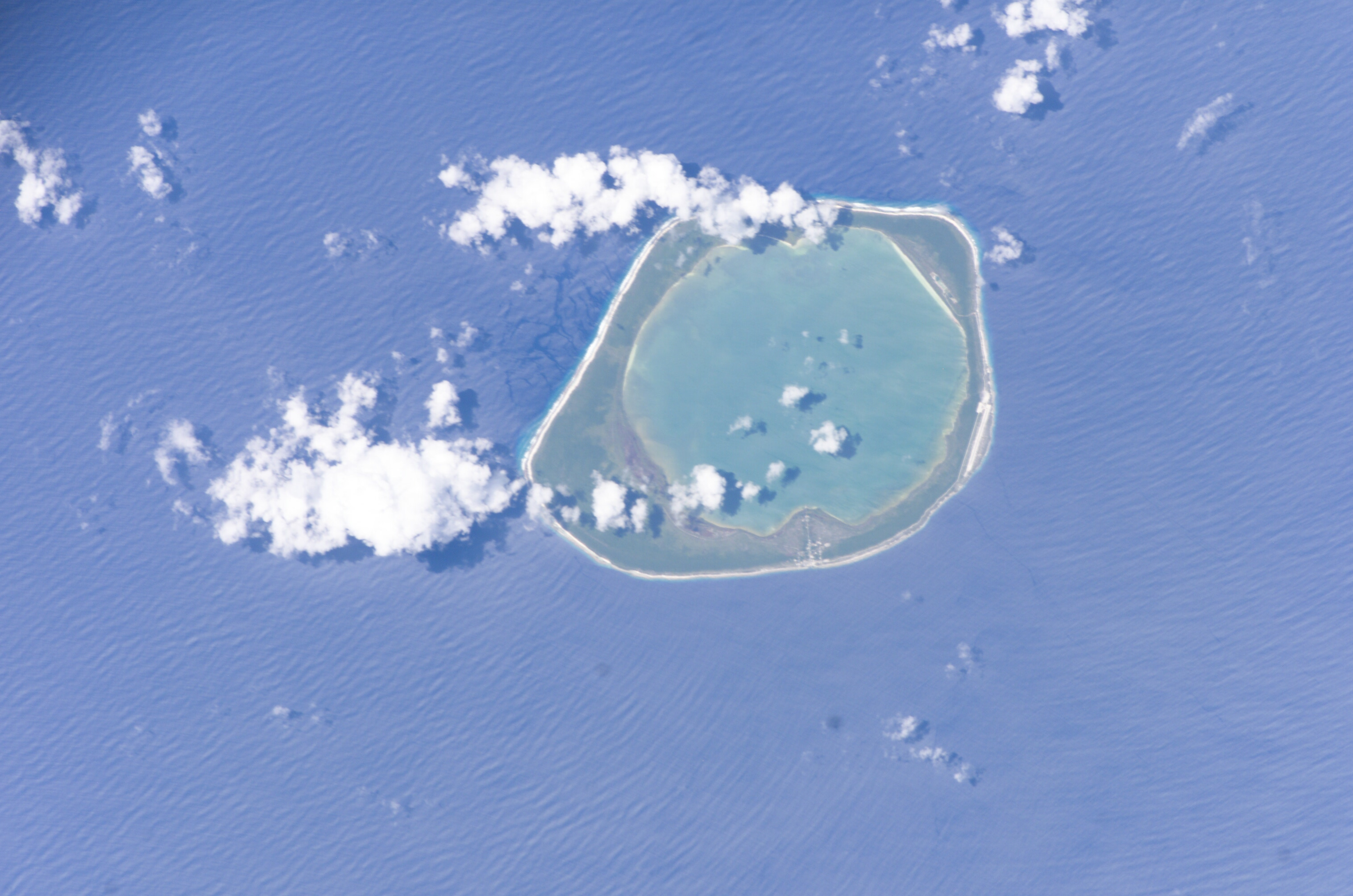
Another NASA picture of Niau Atoll.

Niau is a small atoll in French Polynesia, in the commune of Fakarava (Tuamotu archipelago). This atoll has a broad fringing reef, a diameter of 8 km and an area of 53 km^{2}.

Niau's lagoon is swampy, hypersaline and entirely enclosed. The narrow strip of land surrounding the lagoon is covered by marsh vegetation. The enclosed lagoon area is 33 km^{2}, making the land size at 20 km^{2}. The lagoon has an unusual green color.

The only human settlement on Niau is Tupana, population 226 (as of 2012).

== History ==
The first recorded European to visit Niau was a Russian Admiral Fabian Gottlieb von Bellingshausen in 1820 on ships the Vostok and Mirni. He named this island Greig Island after Aleksey Greig.

== Administration ==
Niau is administratively part of the commune of Fakarava, which consists of the island Fakarava, as well as the atolls of Aratika, Kauehi, Niau, Raraka, Taiaro and Toau.

== Ecology ==
Niau is one of the few locations where the original Tuamotu tropical moist forests ecosystem (known locally as feo) has been preserved. This mixed broadleaf forest ecosystem has disappeared on almost all other atolls. The forest has been preserved in the central parts of the island. It contains several endemic species of plants and animals.

The small Niau kingfisher Todiramphus gertrudae lives now exclusively in the island of Niau. This critically endangered bird disappeared from the Gambier Islands long ago.

== Niau airport ==
Niau Airport is at the northern tip of the atoll (ICAO: NTKN).
