= Taiaro =

Atoll in French Polynesia

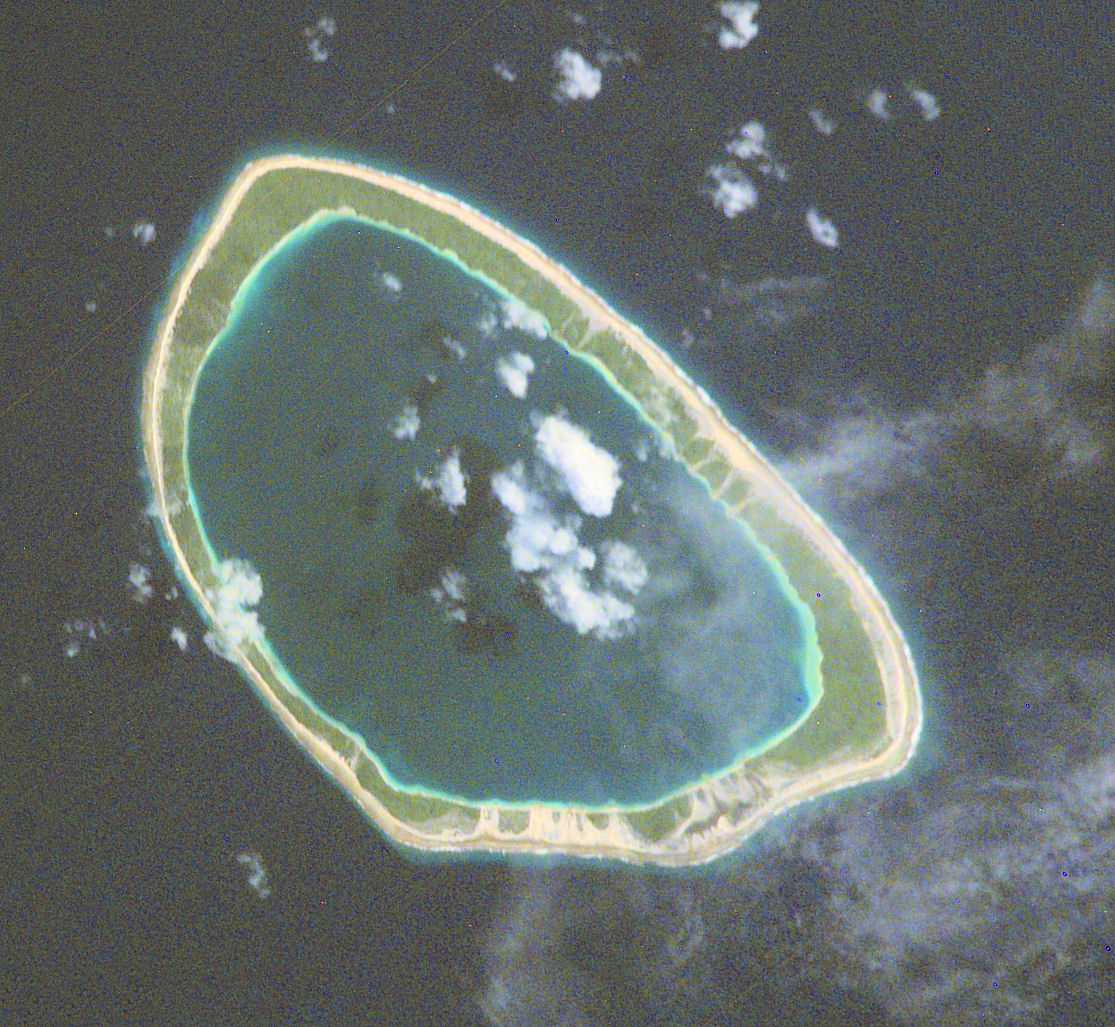
- NASA picture of Taiaro Atoll

- Location within French Polynesia

Geography
- Location: Pacific Ocean
- Coordinates: 15°45′S 144°38′W
- Archipelago: Tuamotus
- Area: 12 km^{2} (4.6 sq mi) (lagoon); 16 km^{2} (6.2 sq mi) (above water)
- Length: 5.7 km (3.54 mi)
- Width: 3.6 km (2.24 mi)
- Highest elevation: 5 m (16 ft)
- Highest point: (unnamed)

Administration
- France
- Overseas collectivity: French Polynesia
- Administrative subdivision: Îles Tuamotu-Gambier
- Commune: Fakarava

Demographics
- Population: 0 (2018)

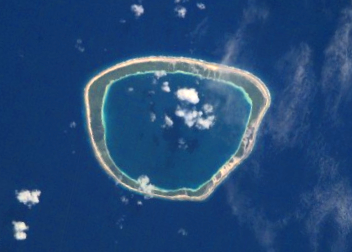
NASA picture of Taiaro Atoll.

Taiaro, or Maro-taua, is a small atoll in the west of the Tuamotu group in French Polynesia. It is one of the smallest of the Tuamotu atolls. Taiaro lies 42 km to the northeast of Raraka Atoll.

The shape of Taiaro Atoll is roughly a polygon 3.7 km across. It has a deep sandy lagoon without any passes to the ocean.

Taiaro Atoll currently has a population of 0 inhabitants.

== History ==
The first recorded European arriving to Taiaro Atoll was Captain Robert FitzRoy on the ship Beagle in 1835. It was the last atoll of the Tuamotus to be recorded and charted.

This atoll was visited by the United States Exploring Expedition led by Charles Wilkes on 29 Aug. 1839. Wilkes named it "King's Island" after the surname of the sailor at the masthead who had first sighted it.

In 1977 Taiaro was declared a protected area by UNESCO under the name Biosphere Reserve Taiaro Atoll.

== Administration ==
The uninhabited Taiaro is private property under the ownership of W.A. Robinson who declared it a nature reserve in 1972. The atoll was officially designated as a UNESCO biosphere reserve in 1977.

Taiaro Atoll belongs to the commune of Fakarava, which consists of Fakarava, as well as the atolls of Aratika, Kauehi, Niau, Raraka, Taiaro and Toau.

== Flora and fauna ==
Taiaro is home to 23 different plant species, all remnant except for a few planted coconut trees. Its lagoon is slightly hypersaline, and is home to 23 species of mollusks and 50 species of different fish.
