= Kauehi =

Atoll in French Polynesia

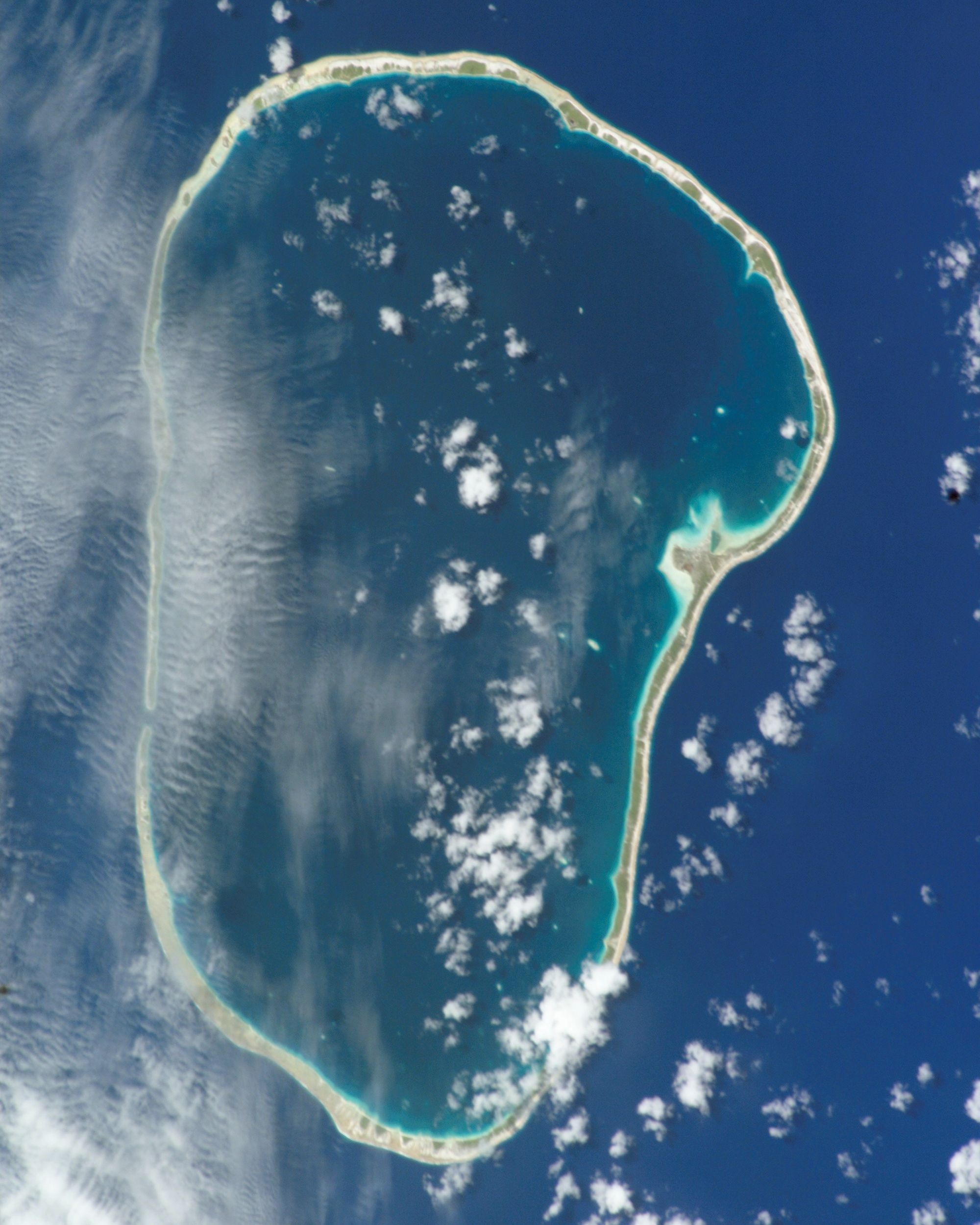
- NASA picture of Kauehi Atoll

- Location within French Polynesia

Geography
- Location: Pacific Ocean
- Coordinates: 15°52′S 145°8′W
- Archipelago: Tuamotus
- Area: 320 km^{2} (120 sq mi) (lagoon); 16 km^{2} (6 sq mi) (above water)
- Length: 24 km (14.9 mi)
- Width: 18 km (11.2 mi)

Administration
- France
- Overseas collectivity: French Polynesia
- Administrative subdivision: Îles Tuamotu-Gambier
- Commune: Fakarava
- Largest settlement: Tearavero

Demographics
- Population: 257 (2012)

Kauehi, or Putake, is an atoll in the Tuamotu group in French Polynesia. The nearest land is Raraka Atoll, located 17 km to the Southeast. Kauehi has a wide lagoon measuring 24 km by 18 km. The atoll has a lagoon area of 320 km^{2} (124 sq mi), and a land area of 16 km^{2} (6 sq mi). Kauehi's lagoon has one navigable pass.

The atoll has 257 inhabitants as of 2012. The main village is called Tearavero.

== History ==
Even though Kauehi Atoll was probably well known to the pearl traders, the first recorded European to visit it was the Beagle's captain Robert FitzRoy in 1835. Kauehi was later visited by the United States Exploring Expedition, 1838–1842. Charles Wilkes called the atoll "Vincennes" after his ship.

== Administration ==
Kauehi Atoll belongs to the commune of Fakarava, which consists of Fakarava, as well as the atolls of Aratika, Kauehi, Niau, Raraka, Taiaro and Toau.
