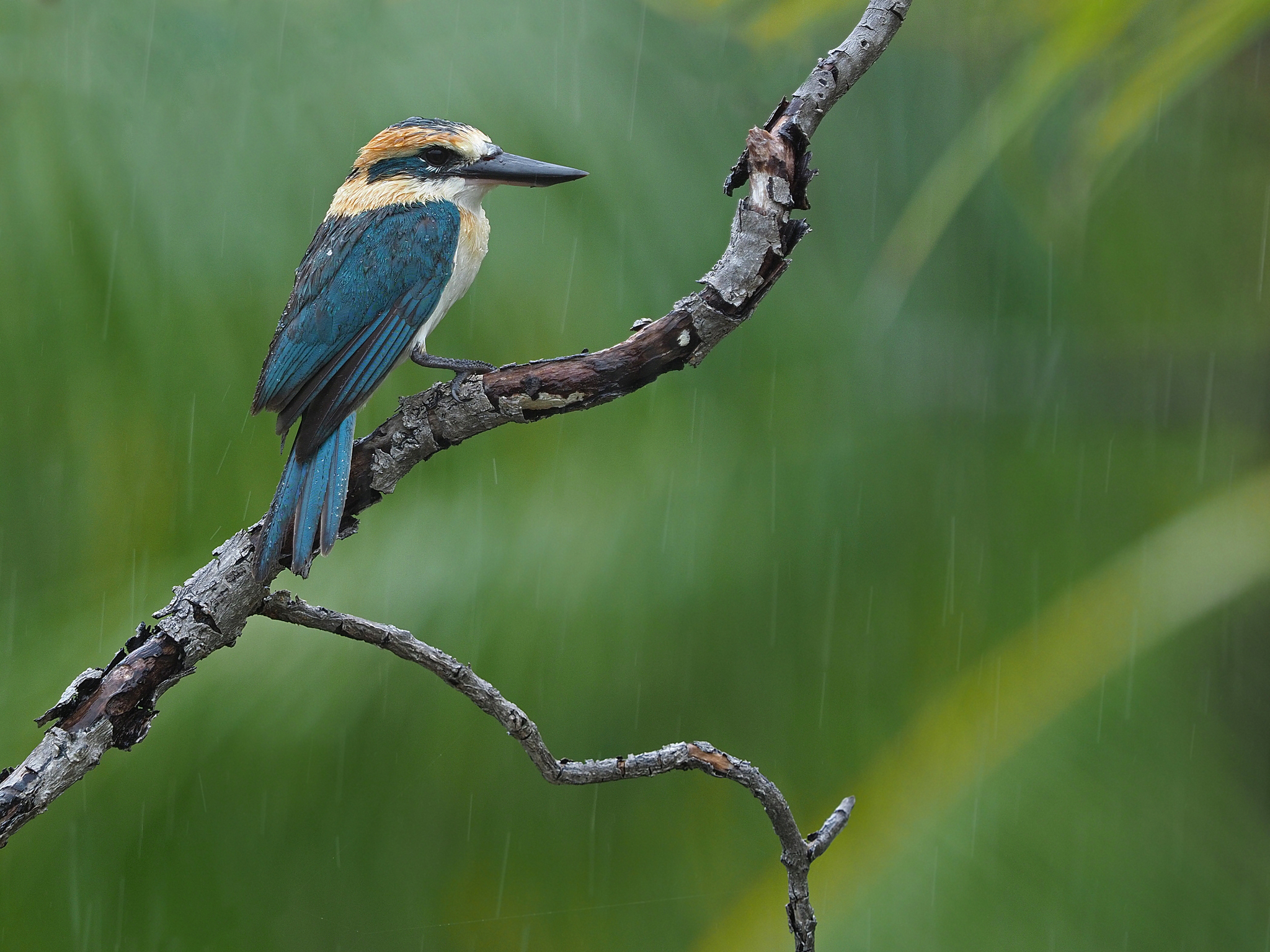
- Tuamotu Kingfisher

Conservation status
- Critically Endangered (IUCN 3.1)

Scientific classification
- Kingdom: Animalia
- Phylum: Chordata
- Class: Aves
- Order: Coraciiformes
- Family: Alcedinidae
- Subfamily: Halcyoninae
- Genus: Todiramphus
- Species: T. gambieri

Binomial name
- Todiramphus gambieri (Oustalet, 1895)

Synonyms
- Halcyon gambieri gambieri Collar and Andrew (1988); Todirhamphus gambieri gambieri Sibley and Monroe (1990, 1993); Todirhamphus gambieri gambieri Collar et al. (1994)

= Mangareva kingfisher =

Species of bird

The Mangareva kingfisher (Todiramphus gambieri), also known as Tuamotu kingfisher, is a species of kingfisher in the family Alcedinidae, endemic to Niau in French Polynesia. It is classified as critically endangered.

== Description ==
The Mangareva kingfisher has a cream-coloured head and neck, with blue ear-coverts, a white chin and frequently a rufous band across the breast. The crown has a variable amount of blue feathers. Mantle, back, rump, wings and tail are blue.

== Distribution and habitat ==
The species only occurs on the island of Niau in the Tuamotus, French Polynesia. It prefers semi-open habitat, including coconut plantations, limestone forests, and cultivated areas around villages. Foraging may take place in wetlands and coastal areas.

== Ecology ==
Like many kingfishers, the Mangareva kingfisher is a terrestrial perch hunter. Hunting takes place from elevated positions, particularly in coconut plantations with open understory and exposed ground. The species takes insects and small lizards, the latter being the main food for chicks. Breeding takes place primarily from September to January in nest cavities excavated from dead and decaying coconut palms.

== Threats and conservation ==
The population of the Mangareva kingfisher appears to have never been very high in recent decades, and has fluctuated heavily in the 2000s. Total numbers of 400-600 birds were reported in 1974, with a drop to 39-51 individuals in 2003 and 2004, and as subsequent rise to an apparently stable population of 135 individuals in 2009. The species is currently classified as critically endangered by the IUCN due to the very small population size and heavily restricted distribution.

The main threats contributing to the species' decline are thought to be predation by cats on nestlings, food competition with rats, a lack of suitable nesting trees (particularly old coconut palms), and generally favourable hunting habitat, as it prefers landscapes cleared with regular burning, a practice that is seeing less use.
