= Aratika =

Atoll in French Polynesia

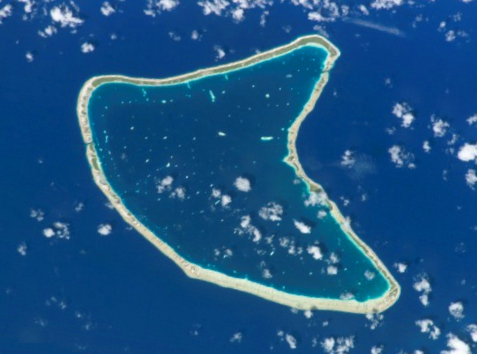
- NASA picture of Aratika Atoll

- Location within French Polynesia

Geography
- Location: Pacific Ocean
- Coordinates: 15°32′S 145°32′W
- Archipelago: Tuamotus
- Area: 145 km^{2} (56 sq mi) (lagoon); 8.3 km^{2} (3 sq mi) (above water)
- Length: 20.8 km (12.92 mi)
- Width: 10.7 km (6.65 mi)

Administration
- France
- Overseas collectivity: French Polynesia
- Administrative subdivision: Îles Tuamotu-Gambier
- Commune: Fakarava
- Largest settlement: Paparara

Demographics
- Population: 160 (2012)
- Pop. density: 19/km^{2} (49/sq mi)

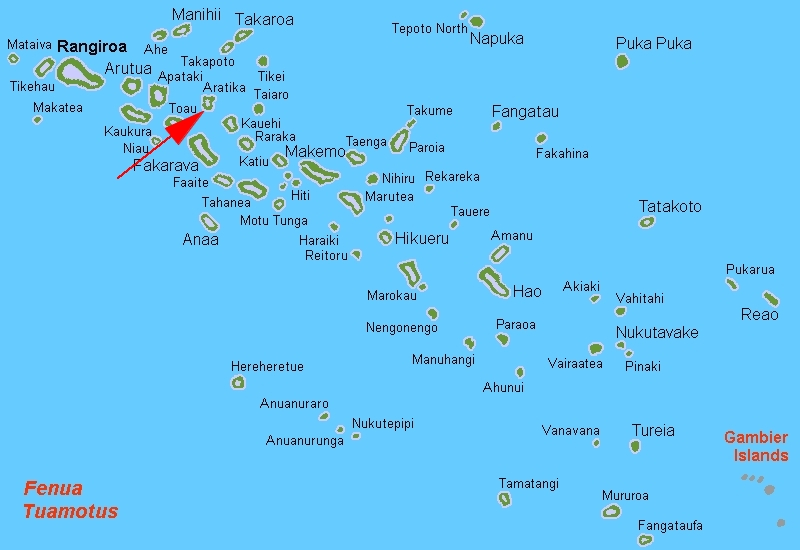
Location of Aratika Atoll

Aratika is an atoll in the Tuamotu group in French Polynesia. The nearest land is Kauehi Atoll, located 35 km to the south east.

Aratika has an unusual butterfly shape. Its length is 20.8 km^{2} (8.0 sq mi) and its maximum width 10.7 km^{2} (4.1 sq mi) . It has a land area of approximately 8.3 km^{2} (3.2 sq mi) . The lagoon is wide and deep, and can be entered by two navigable passes.

Aratika had 160 inhabitants in 2012. The main village is called Paparara.

== History ==
Aratika appears in some maps as "Carlshoff Island." This atoll was visited by the Charles Wilkes expedition on September 3, 1839. Prior to the pearl market slump at the turn of the century, Aratika was home to about 2000 people, thereafter dropping to about 200.

Aratika has a private airfield which opened in 1998 and is owned by the Fourcade company. Much of the island's main infrastructure, including the school and many businesses from Paparara village, were moved for ease of access to and from the airstrip.

The population has been slowly declining. It is cut in half when the children go to school at the age of 11, as there is only a primary school on the island which has one class for 3-11 year olds.

== Administration ==
Aratika Atoll belongs to the commune of Fakarava, which consists of Fakarava, as well as the atolls of Aratika, Kauehi, Niau, Raraka, Taiaro and Toau.

== Images & Maps ==
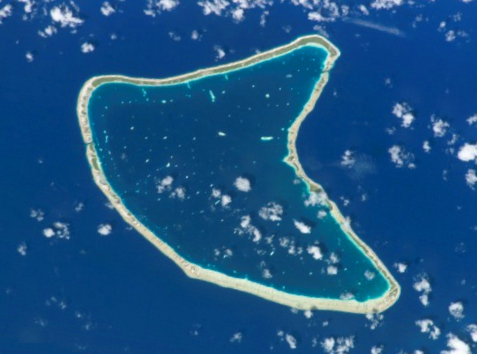
Image Source: ISS005-E-13941

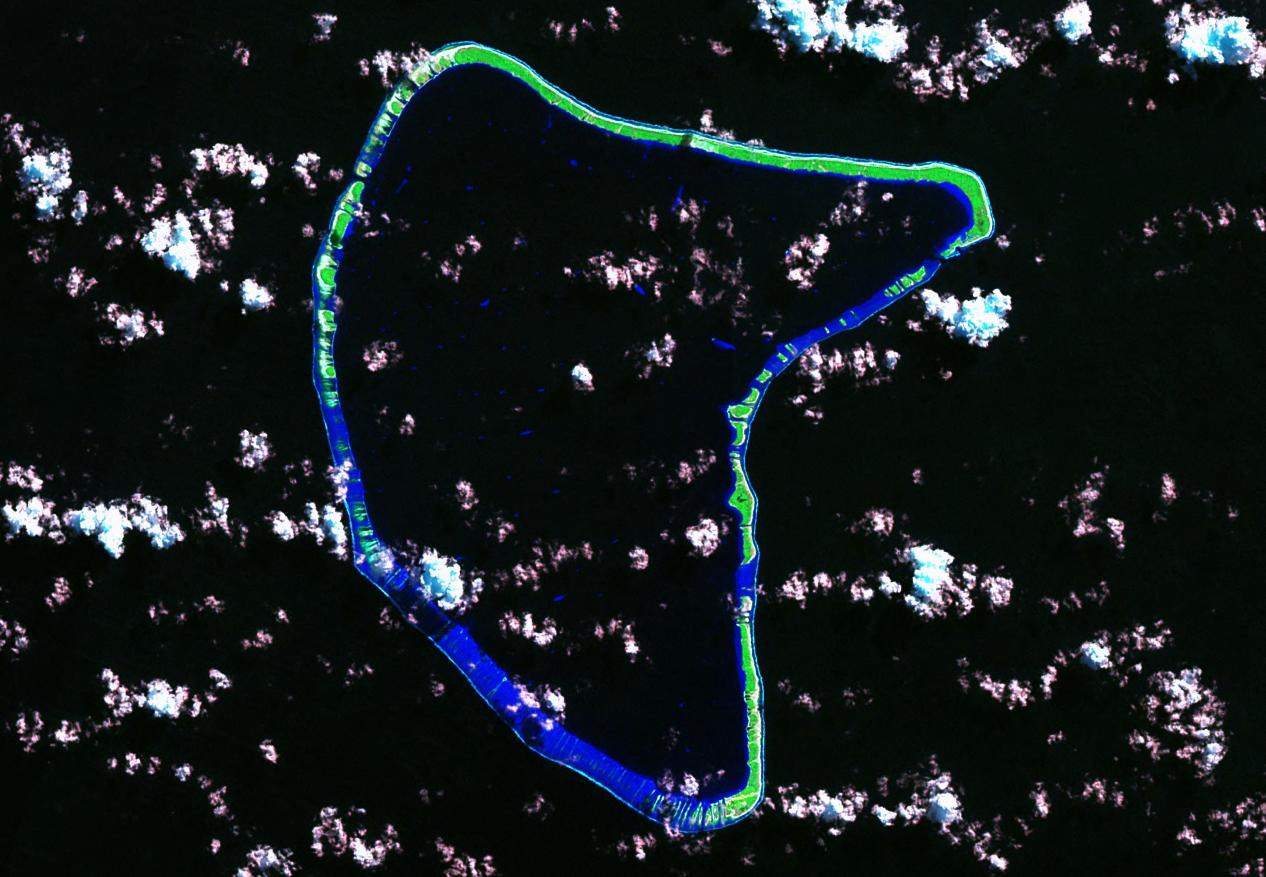
Image Source: Landsat S-06-15_2000 (1:115,000)

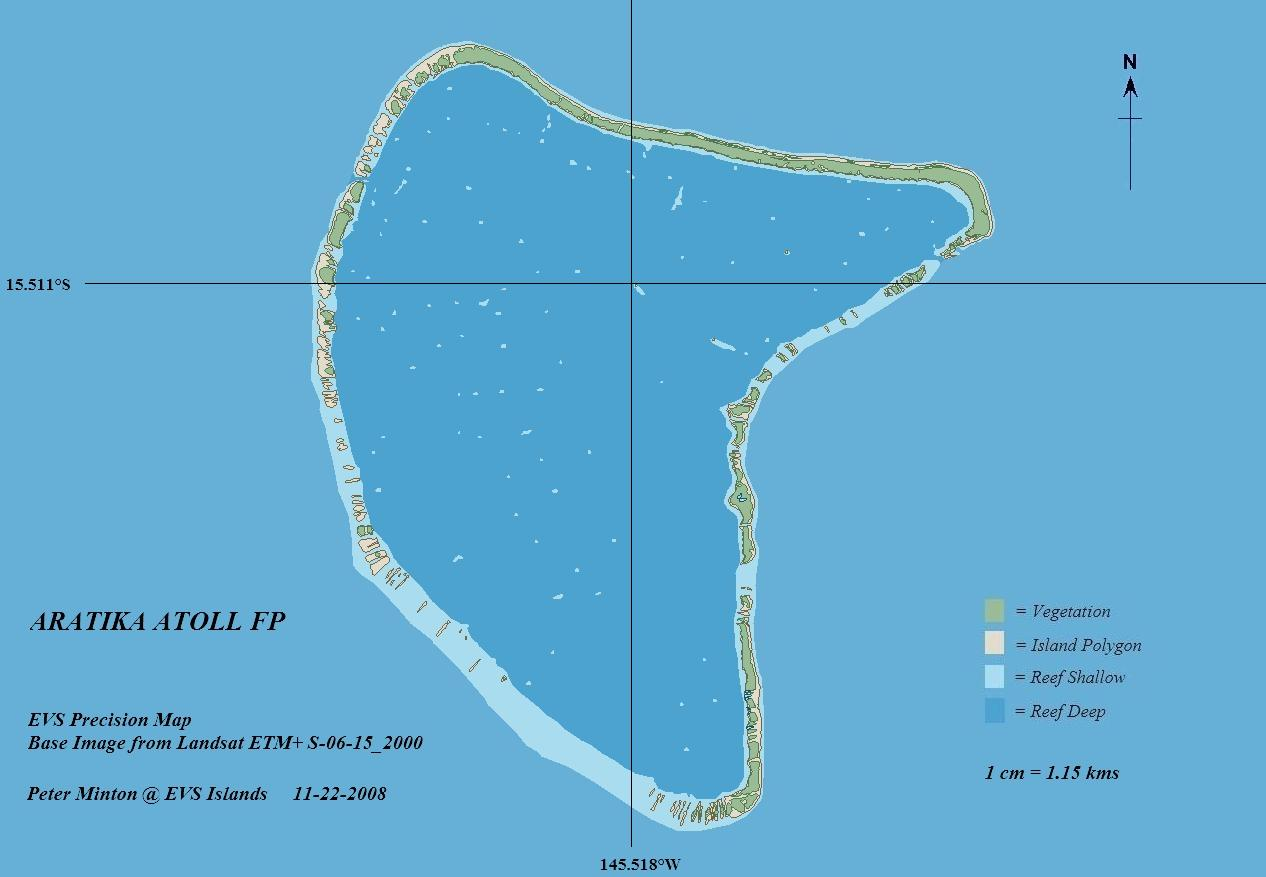
Map Source: EVS Precision Map (1:150,000)
