= Raraka =

Atoll in French Polynesia

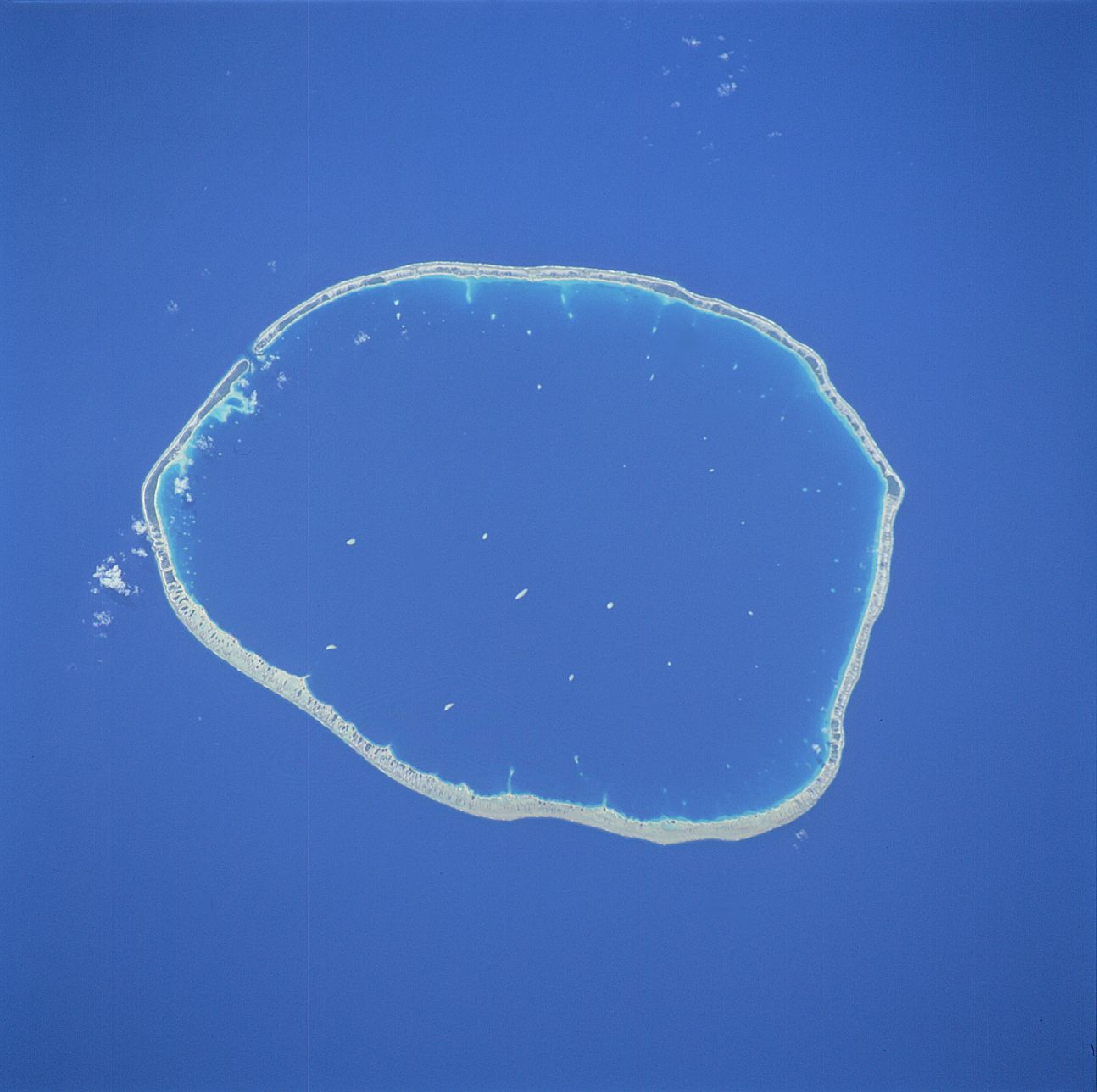
- NASA picture of Raraka Atoll

- Location within French Polynesia

Geography
- Location: Pacific Ocean
- Coordinates: 16°10′S 144°54′W
- Archipelago: Tuamotus
- Area: 342 km^{2} (132 sq mi) (lagoon); 14 km^{2} (5.4 sq mi) (above water)
- Length: 27 km (16.8 mi)
- Width: 19 km (11.8 mi)

Administration
- France
- Overseas collectivity: French Polynesia
- Administrative subdivision: Îles Tuamotu-Gambier
- Commune: Fakarava

Demographics
- Population: 110 (2012)

Raraka, or Te Marie, is an atoll in the west of the Tuamotu group in French Polynesia. It lies 17 km to the southeast of Kauehi Atoll.

The shape of Raraka Atoll is an oval 27 km long and 19 km wide. Its fringing reef has many sandbanks and small motu (islets). This atoll has a wide lagoon with a navigable pass to the ocean.

Raraka has 96 inhabitants (2017). There is only one village on Motutapu in the northwest.

Raraka Atoll in the Tuamotus should not be confused with Raraka in Malaita, Solomon Islands 09°11′S 161°01′W.

== History ==
The first recorded European to sight Raraka Atoll was Captain Ireland in 1831.

Raraka Atoll was visited by the historic United States Exploring Expedition on 30 Aug. 1839. Charles Wilkes reported: "The next day they reached Raraka Atoll and were allowed ashore to explore it on that and the following day. There they met about 40 peaceful islanders, who had native-born missionary among them. Their chief was missing his left hand, it having been bitten off by a shark."

== Administration ==
Raraka Atoll belongs to the commune of Fakarava, which consists of Fakarava, as well as the atolls of Aratika, Kauehi, Niau, Raraka, Taiaro and Toau.

== See also ==
- Desert island
- List of islands
