= Paparara =

Village in French Polynesia

Coordinates: 15.509°S 145.455°W

Paparara is a village on Aratika atoll. It is 3 km SE of Aratika Airport and 15 km NE of Aratika-Perles Airport.
