= Tuamotus =

Archipelago in French Polynesia

Tuamotu Islands
Native name: Îles Tuamotu (French) / Tuamotus (Tuamotuan) / Paumotus (Tahitian)
- Flag of the Tuamotu Islands

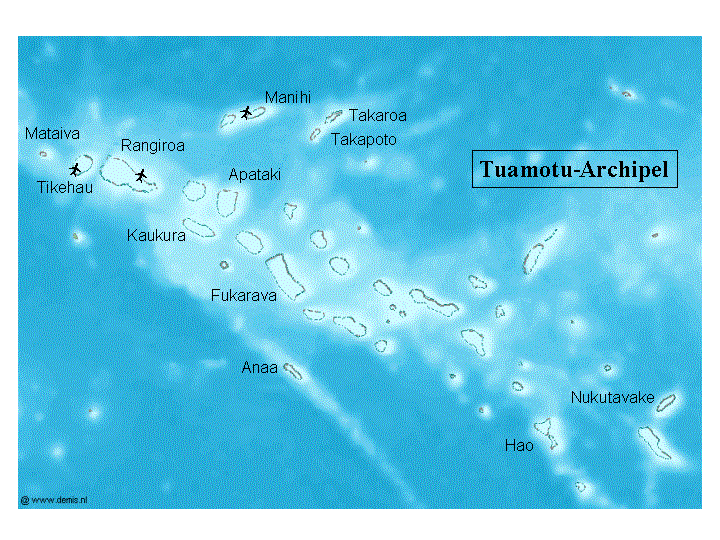
- Interactive map of Tuamotu Islands

Geography
- Location: Pacific Ocean
- Coordinates: 18.75°S 141.76°W
- Archipelago: Polynesia
- Total islands: 78
- Major islands: Rangiroa, Anaa, Fakarava, Hao, Makemo
- Area: 850 km^{2} (330 sq mi)

Administration
- France
- Collectivity: French Polynesia
- Largest settlement: Rangiroa (pop. 2,709 (2017))

Demographics
- Population: 15,346 (2017)
- Pop. density: 18/km^{2} (47/sq mi)
- Languages: French, Tuamotuan

Additional information
- Time zone: UTC-10

The Tuamotu Archipelago or the Tuamotu Islands (French: Îles Tuamotu, officially Archipel des Tuamotu) are a French Polynesian chain of just under 80 islands and atolls in the southern Pacific Ocean. They constitute the largest chain of atolls in the world, extending (from northwest to southeast) over an area roughly the size of Western Europe. Their combined land area is 850 square kilometres (328 square miles). This archipelago's major islands are Rangiroa, Anaa, Fakarava, Hao and Makemo.

The Tuamotus have approximately 16,000 inhabitants. The islands were initially settled by Polynesians, and modern Tuamotuans have inherited from them a shared culture and the Tuamotuan language.

== History ==
The early history of the Tuamotu islands is generally unknown. Archaeological findings suggest that the western Tuamotus were settled from the Society Islands as early as 900 CE or as late as 1200 CE. DNA evidence suggests that they were settled about 1110 CE. On the islands of Rangiroa, Manihi and Mataiva, there are flat ceremonial platforms (called marae) made of coral blocks, although their exact age is unknown.

The first known European encounter with the Tuamotus was with the Portuguese sailor Ferdinand Magellan, during his circumglobal voyage in 1521. His encounter was followed by visits from several other Europeans, including:

- Portuguese sailor Pedro Fernandes de Queirós in 1606;
- Dutch mariners Willem Schouten and Jacob Le Maire in 1616;
- Jacob Roggeveen (who also first sighted Easter Island) in 1722;
- John Byron in 1765;
- Louis Antoine de Bougainville in 1768;
- James Cook during his first voyage in 1769;
- Spanish navigator Domingo de Bonechea in 1774 and
- Russian expedition of Otto von Kotzebue in 1815.

None of these visits were of political consequence, as the islands were within the sphere of influence of the Pōmare Dynasty of Tahiti.

The first Christian missionaries arrived in the islands at the beginning of the 19th century. By the late 19th century, traders had begun offering pearls from the islands for sale in Europe, and they became coveted possessions there. France forced the abdication of King Pōmare V of Tahiti and claimed the islands, but did not formally annex them.

Robert Louis Stevenson and Fanny Stevenson travelled among the Tuamotus (then called the Paumotus) on the yacht Casco in 1888; an account of their journey was published as In the South Seas. Jack London wrote a story, "The Seed of McCoy", based on an incident in 1900 in which a burning ship, the Pyrenees, had been safely beached on Mangareva. In the story, London has the ship sail past Mangareva and all through the Tuamotus before beaching on Fakarava.

The Tuamotus made headlines around the world in 1947, when the Norwegian ethnographer Thor Heyerdahl, sailing from South America with a crew of five others, reached Raroia on his raft Kon-Tiki. The islands were in the news again somewhat later, when France conducted nuclear weapons testing on the atolls of Moruroa and Fangataufa.

== Administrative divisions ==
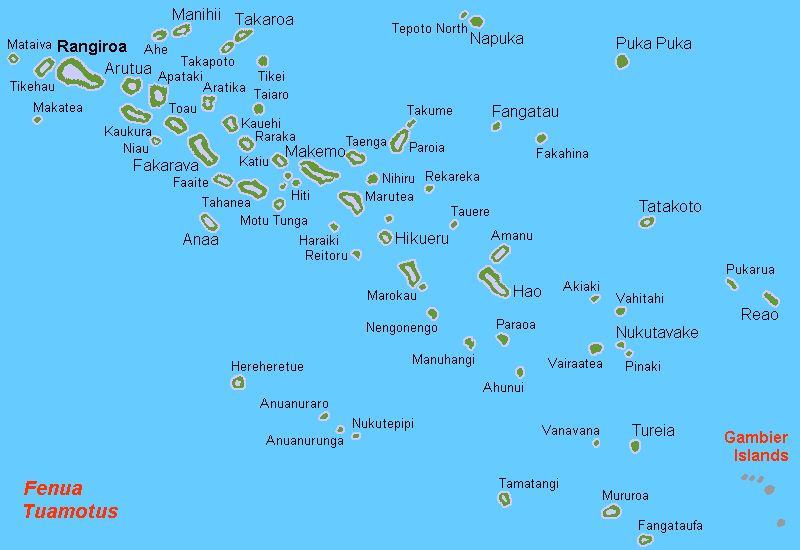
Map of Tuamotus

French Polynesia is a semi-autonomous island group designated as an overseas country of France. The Tuamotus combine with the Gambier Islands to form the Îles Tuamotu-Gambier which is one of the five administrative divisions of French Polynesia.

The Tuamotus are grouped into sixteen communes: Anaa; Arutua; Fakarava; Fangatau; Hao; Hikueru; Makemo; Manihi; Napuka; Nukutavake; Puka Puka; Rangiroa; Reao; Takaroa; Tatakoto; and Tureia.

=== Electoral divisions ===
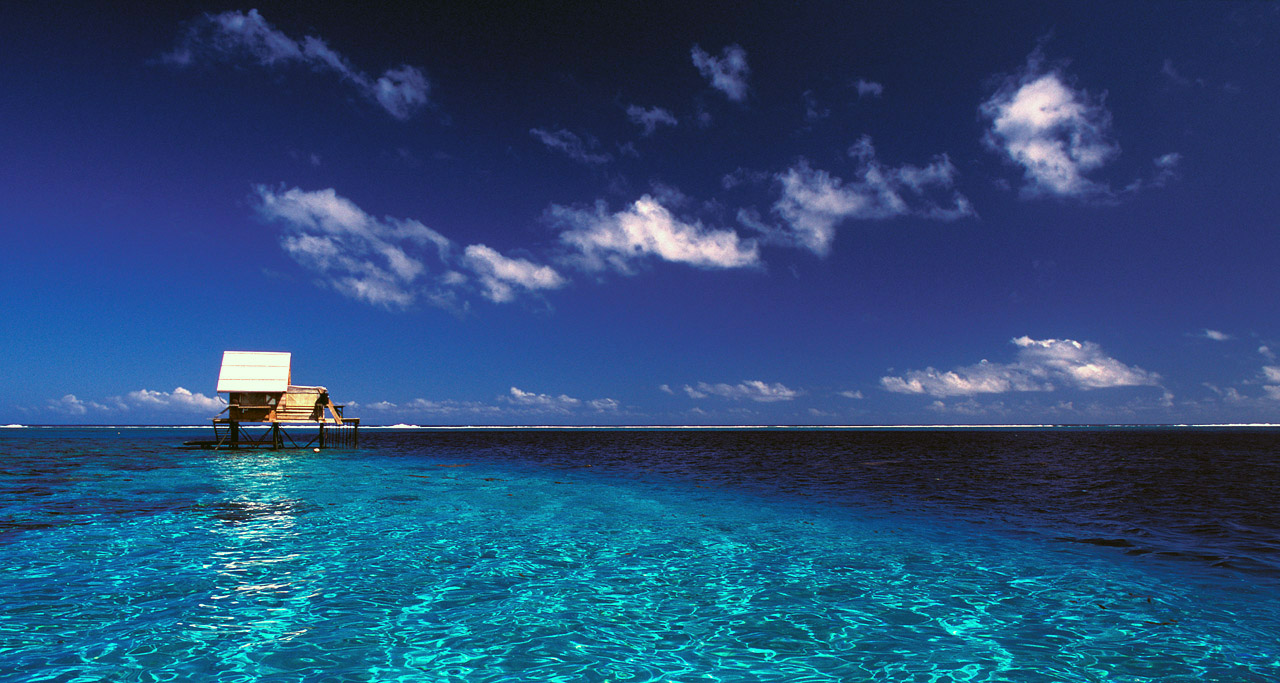
Pearl farm in the Tuamotus

The communes on Tuamotu are part of two different electoral districts (circonscriptions électorales) represented in the Assembly of French Polynesia. The electoral district called Îles Gambier et Tuamotu Est comprises the commune of Gambier and eleven communes in eastern Tuamotu: Anaa, Fangatau, Hao, Hikueru, Makemo, Napuka, Nukutavake, Pukapuka, Reao, Tatakoto, and Tureia. The other five communes in western Tuamotu – Arutua, Fakarava, Manihi, Rangiroa, and Takaroa – form the electoral district called Îles Tuamotu Ouest.

== Geography ==
Despite the vast spread of the archipelago, it covers a total land area of only about 885 square kilometres (342 mi^{2}). The climate is a warm tropical one, without sharply distinct seasons. The average annual temperature is a relatively continuous 26 °C (79 °F). Water sources such as lakes or rivers are absent, leaving catchments of rain as the only source of fresh water. The annual average rainfall is 1,400 millimetres (55 in). Although average rainfall is lowest in September and November, it does not vary markedly throughout the year.

The archipelago is geologically highly stable, because it was created by the action of the Easter fracture zone, which is only weakly active. There have been no volcanic eruptions during recorded history.

=== Flora and fauna ===
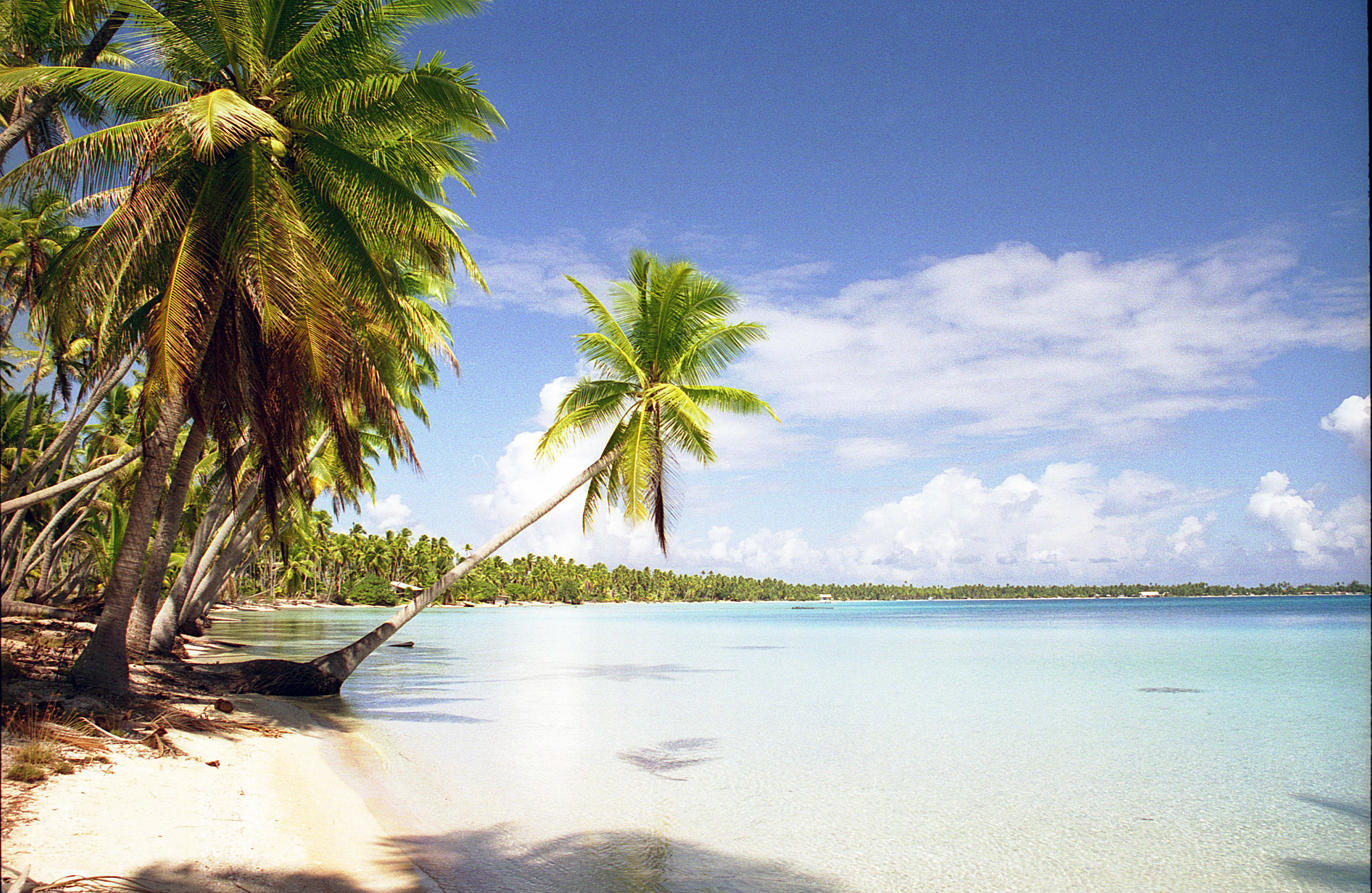
Coconut palms, Takapoto

The sparse soil of the coral islands does not support diverse vegetation. The coconut palm, which is the basis of copra production, is of special economic importance. On a few of the islands, vanilla is also cultivated. Agriculture is generally otherwise limited to simple subsistence. Fruit and vegetable staples include yams, taro, breadfruit, and a wide range of tropical fruit. Pandanus leaves are traditionally woven together to make mats, hats, and roof thatches. However, many of the roofs nowadays are made of corrugated sheet-metal. There are also mangrove forests in sheltered areas, though it's less common around coral atolls.

The species-rich reefs are home to a diverse range of underwater fauna. The surface creatures are primarily seabirds, insects, and lizards. The Tuamotus have 86 species of birds, ten of which are endemic, including the Tuamotu kingfisher, the Tuamotu reed warbler, and the Tuamotu sandpiper. Thirteen species are globally threatened, and one has gone extinct.

=== Geology ===
All of the islands of the Tuamotus are coral "low islands": essentially high sand bars built upon coral reefs. Makatea, southwest of the Palliser Islands, is one of three great phosphate rocks in the Pacific Ocean. (The others are Banaba in Kiribati, and the island nation of Nauru.) Although the Gambier Islands are geographically part of the Tuamotus because they lie at the southeastern extreme of the archipelago, they are geologically and culturally distinct.

The ring-shaped atoll Taiaro, which lies in the northwestern portion of the archipelago, is a rare example of a coral reef that has a fully enclosed lagoon. Taiaro has been officially designated a UNESCO biosphere reserve since 1977.

== Island groups ==
The Tuamotu archipelago consists of several groups of small islands and atolls:

Palliser Islands
Island	Population	Commune
Mataiva	280	Rangiroa
Tikehau	529	Rangiroa
Rangiroa	2,567	Rangiroa
Makatea	68	Rangiroa
Arutua	826	Arutua
Apataki	350	Arutua
Kaukura	475	Arutua
Toau	18	Fakarava
Niau	226	Fakarava
Fakarava	837	Fakarava

West-Central Tuamotus and the Raeffsky Islands
Island	Population	Commune
Aratika	160	Fakarava
Kauehi	257	Fakarava
Taiaro	0	Fakarava
Raraka	110	Fakarava
Anaa	530	Anaa
Faaite	440	Anaa
Tahanea	0	Anaa
Motutunga	0	Anaa
Katiu	257	Makemo
Tuanake	6	Makemo
Hiti	0	Makemo
Tepoto (South)	0	Makemo
Makemo	816	Makemo
Taenga	65	Makemo
Takume	116	Makemo
Raroia	253	Makemo
Nihiru	11	Makemo
Marutea Nord	0	Makemo
Haraiki	0	Makemo

East-Central Tuamotus
Island	Population	Commune
Tekokota	0	Hikueru
Reitoru	0	Hikueru
Hikueru	125	Hikueru
Marokau	91	Hikueru
Ravahere	0	Hikueru
Rekareka	0	Hao
Tauere	3	Hao
Amanu	192	Hao
Hao	1,009	Hao
Nengonengo	54	Hao
Manuhangi	0	Hao
Paraoa	0	Hao
Ahunui	0	Hao
Fangatau	150	Fangatau
Fakahina	155	Fangatau

Far East Tuamotus
Island	Population	Commune
Tatakoto	180	Tatakoto
Akiaki	13	Nukutavake
Vahitahi	105	Nukutavake
Nukutavake	119	Nukutavake
Pinaki	0	Nukutavake
Vairaatea	57	Nukutavake
Pukarua	227	Reao
Reao	305	Reao
Vanavana	0	Tureia
Tureia	275	Tureia
Moruroa	0	Tureia
Fangataufa	0	Tureia
Tematagi	58	Tureia

King George Islands
Island	Population	Commune
Ahe	552	Manihi
Manihi	648	Manihi
Takapoto	380	Takaroa
Takaroa	537	Takaroa
Tikei	0	Takaroa

Duke of Gloucester Islands
Island	Population	Commune
Hereheretue	56	Hao
Anuanuraro	0	Hao
Anuanurunga	0	Hao
Nukutepipi	0	Hao

Disappointment Islands
Island	Population	Commune
Tepoto (North)	61	Napuka
Napuka	255	Napuka
Puka-Puka	137	Puka-Puka

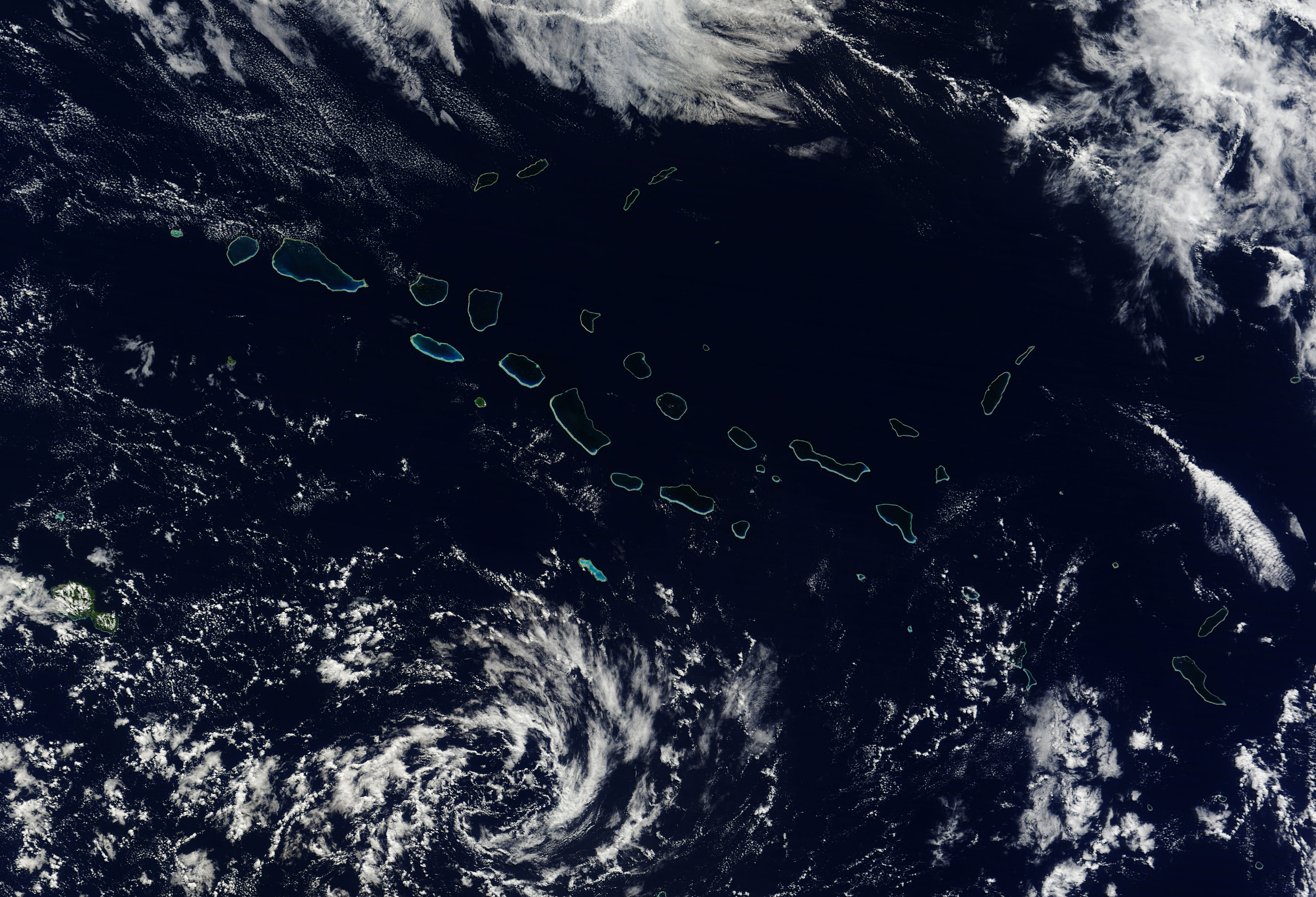
Satellite image of Tuamotus

Related island groups include three groups. The Acteon Group, which is usually considered culturally and geographically linked to the Tuamotus, is politically part of the Gambier Commune. The three Outer Gambier islands, often considered part of the Tuamotus culturally, but variably geographically linked to either the Tuamotus or Gambiers, is also politically part of the Gambier Commune. Finally, the islets consisting of Mangareva Atoll, as well as Temoe, are considered unquestionably part of the Gambier Islands culturally, geographically, and politically.

- The Acteon Group: Matureivavao, Tenararo, Tenarunga, and Vahanga.
- The Outer Gambier Group: Marutea Sud, Maria Est, and Morane
- The Gambier Group: Includes the islets of the Mangareva Atoll: (Akamaru, Angakauitai, Aukena, Kamaka, Kouaku, Makapu, Makaroa, Mangareva, Manui, Mekiro, Papuri, Puaumu, Taravai, Tokorua, and Totengengie) and Temoe

== Demographics ==
A little more than fifty atolls are permanently populated; the rest are occupied only sporadically, during the copra harvesting season or as a base for fishing expeditions. The population has grown in the last years due to the fishing boom in the northern part and the extraction of pearls, especially black pearls, in the west and in the center. In any case, most of the inhabitants practise subsistence agriculture.

In the 2007 census, there were 15,510 inhabitants in the Tuamotu Islands, a population density of 18 inhabitants/km^{2}. The population was 14,876 in 2002 and 8,100 in 1983. In 2002, 769 inhabitants lived within 400 km of the islands of Moruroa and Fangataufa (former nuclear test base).

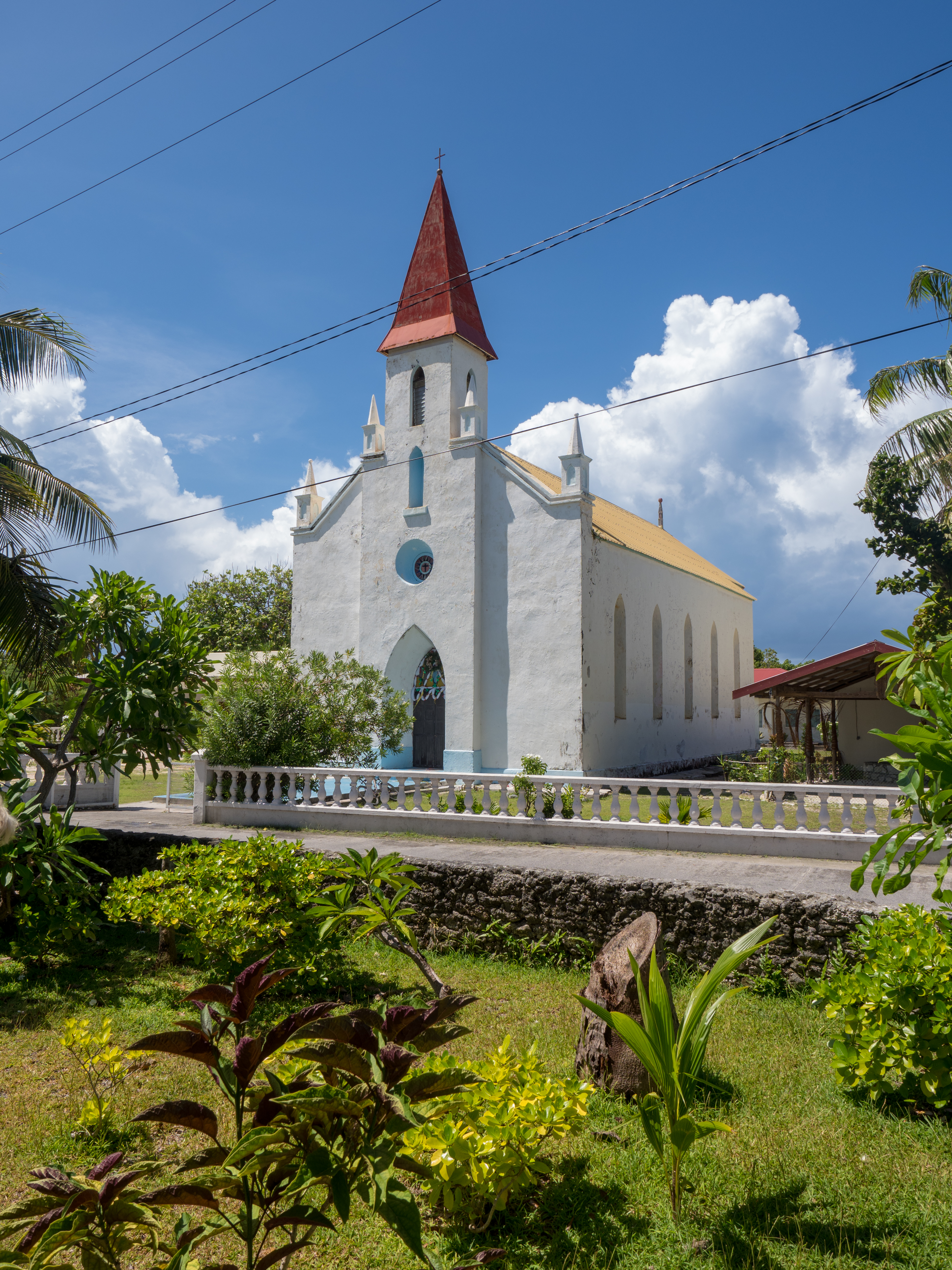
Our Lady of Peace Church (Église Notre-Dame-de-Paix de Tiputa), Rangiroa

=== Languages ===
The official language of the archipelago is French. However, the Tuamotu language, Pa'umotu, is recognized as a regional language of the French Republic. In the Gambier Islands, Mangarevan is spoken, while in Puka Puka a Marquesan dialect is used.

=== Religion ===
The majority of the population is Christian, including members of the Catholic Church and various Protestant groups. The Catholic Church administers 42 churches on the islands under the Metropolitan Archdiocese of Papeete.

In 1833, the Catholic Church divided the Pacific into two apostolic vicariates: Western Oceania fell to the Marists and Eastern Oceania-which included the Tuamots, Hawaii, Tahiti, the Marquesas and the Cook Islands-was the responsibility of the Picpus missionaries. In 1834, the French Fathers Honoré Laval and François d'Assise Caret arrived in Mangareva.

First with the acquiescence and then with the active support of the island chiefs, the Picpusians embarked on an extensive development program for the Gambier Islands. This included the introduction of cotton cultivation, pearl and mother-of-pearl fishing, and the establishment of plantations and orchards. As they were very successful, their missionary activities gradually spread to the other islands of the Tuamotu archipelago. With the missionary work, news of the islands' wealth in pearls also reached Europe, making them a coveted destination for European traders and adventurers.

== Economy ==
The islands' economy is predominantly based on subsistence agriculture. The most important sources of additional income are the cultivation of black pearls and the preparation of copra. Tourism-related income remains meager, especially compared to the income generated by tourism in the neighboring Society Islands. Modest tourism infrastructure is found on the atolls of Rangiroa and Manihi, which offer recreational scuba diving and snorkeling destinations.

The inhabitants of Tuamotu produce 75% of the copra of French Polynesia. It is a subsidized family activity and the only resource of the atolls farthest from the center and east.

Fishing is a major activity in the atolls closest to Tahiti (Rangiroa, Arutua, Apataki), which supply the central market of Papeete.

== See also ==
- Overseas France
- Islands controlled by France in the Indian and Pacific oceans
