= Toau =

Atoll in French Polynesia

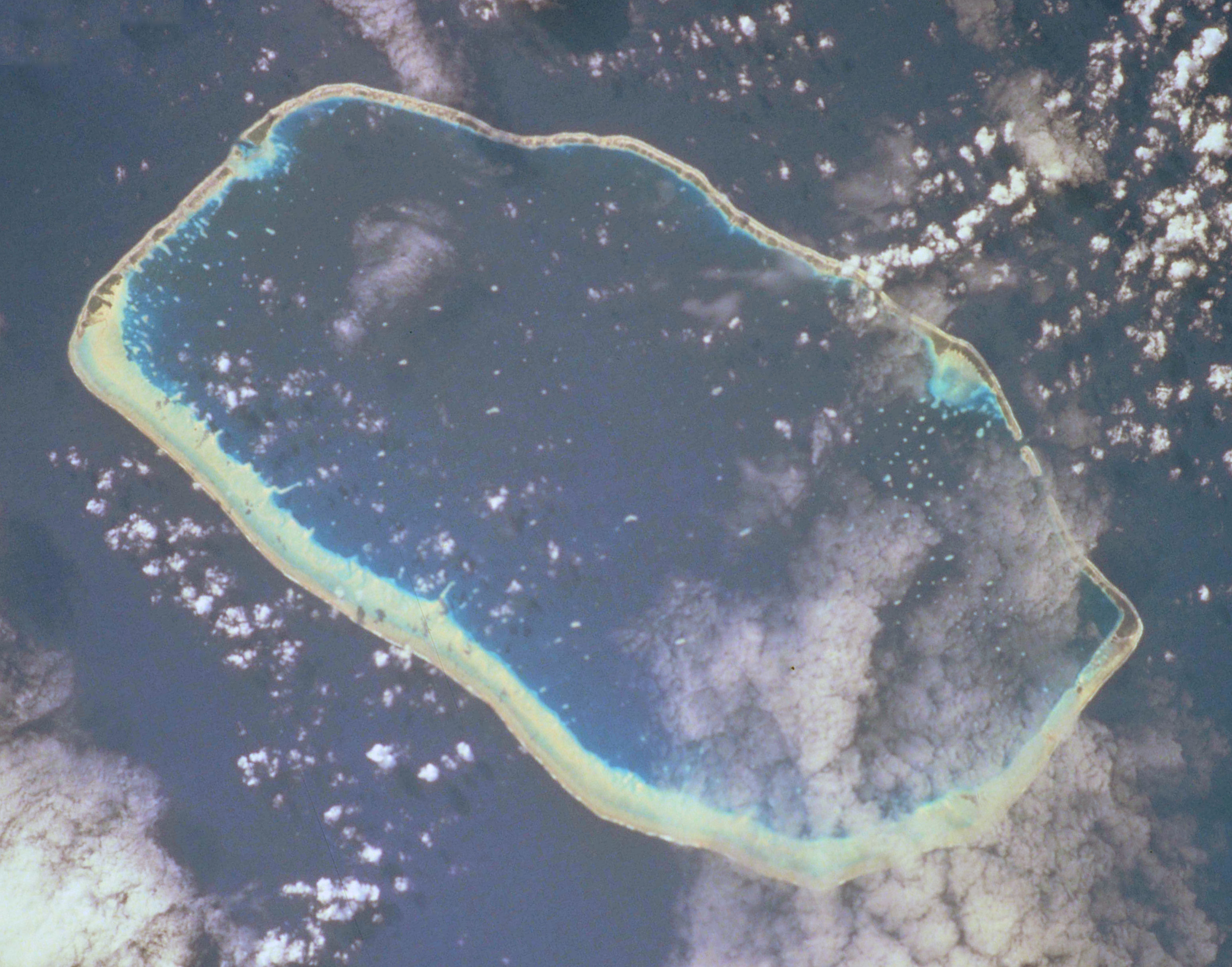
- NASA picture of Toau Atoll

- Location within French Polynesia

Geography
- Location: Pacific Ocean
- Coordinates: 15°49′S 146°0′W
- Archipelago: Tuamotus
- Area: 561 km^{2} (217 sq mi) (lagoon); 12 km^{2} (5 sq mi) (above water)
- Length: 35 km (21.7 mi)
- Width: 18 km (11.2 mi)

Administration
- France
- Overseas collectivity: French Polynesia
- Administrative subdivision: Îles Tuamotu-Gambier
- Commune: Fakarava

Demographics
- Population: 18 (2012)

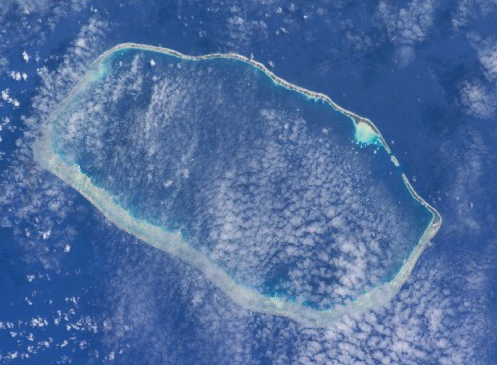

Toau, Pakuria, or Taha-a-titi is a coral atoll in French Polynesia, one of the Palliser Islands (Îles Pallisier). Toau has a wide lagoon; length 35 kilometres (22 miles), width 18 kilometres (11 miles). The nearest land is Fakarava Atoll, located 14 kilometres (8.7 miles) to the southeast.

Toau Atoll had a population of 18 in 2012. The main village is called Maragai.

== Historical facts ==
Captain James Cook was the first recorded European to sight the atoll, in April 1774. In some maps Toau appears as "Elizabeth".

== Administration ==
Toau Atoll belongs to the commune of Fakarava, which consists of Fakarava, as well as the atolls of Aratika, Kauehi, Niau, Raraka, Taiaro, and Toau.
