= Tiana =

Tiana may refer to:

- Tiana (given name), including a list of people and fictional characters with the name
- Tiana, Catalonia, Spain, a town
- Tiana, Sardinia, a municipality
- Tiana (The Princess and the Frog), from the Disney film

== See also ==
- Tyana, an ancient city in Cappadocia
- Tyana (moth), a genus of moths
