= Tuamotu kingfisher =

Tuamotu kingfisher has been split into the following species:

- Niau kingfisher, Todiramphus gertrudae
- Mangareva kingfisher, Todiramphus gambieri
