= Teana (Fangatau Atoll) =

- Village
- Location within French Polynesia
- Coordinates: 15°49′44″S 140°53′28″W
- Country: France
- Overseas collectivity: French Polynesia
- Commune: Fangatau

Area
  - Total: 6 km^{2} (2.3 sq mi)

Population (August 2012)
  - Total: 145

Teana is a village located in the Fangatau atoll.

== Geography ==
Teana is the main village on the atoll and is scattered across the main islet. There are also parts of the village on two other adjacent small islets. The rest of the village is connected to those two islets by a bridge. There is a bridge to the fourth islet, however it looks uninhabited.

There is about 6 km² (2 sq mi) of land above water. About 5 km² of that land contains the lagoon.

According to the August 2012 census, there were 145 people living in Teana. There were 24 per square kilometer (62/sq mi).
