= Fangatau =

Atoll in French Polynesia

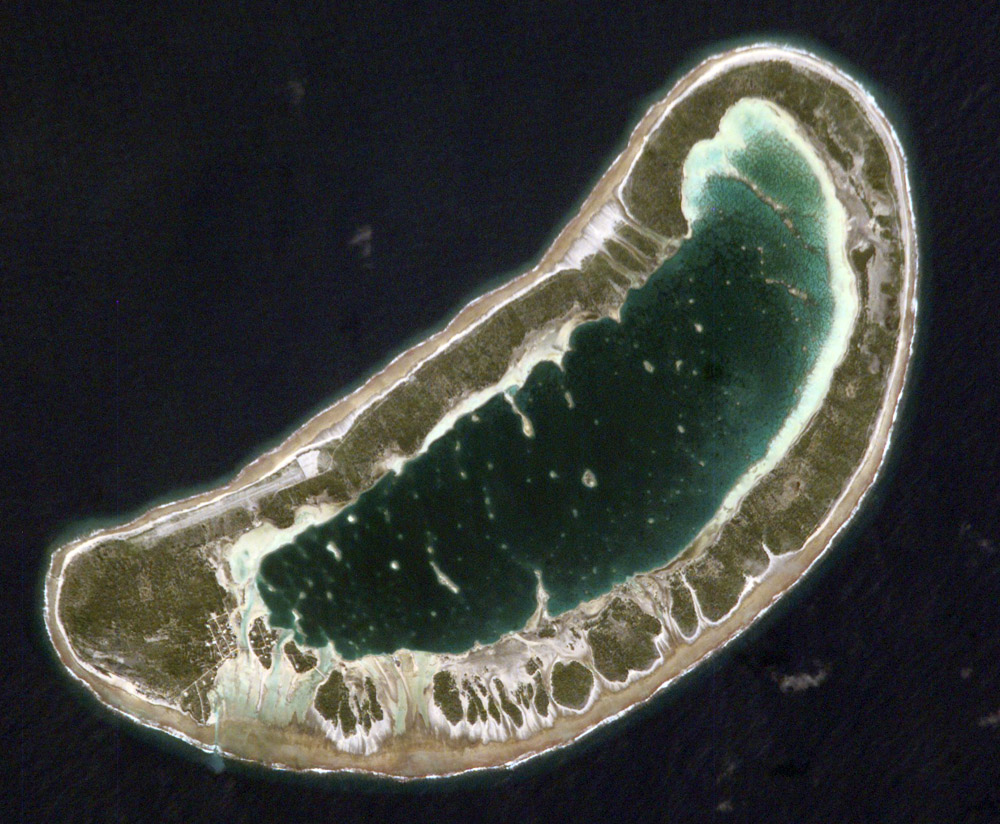
- NASA picture of Fangatau Atoll

- Location within French Polynesia

Geography
- Location: Pacific Ocean
- Coordinates: 15°49′12″S 140°53′14″W
- Archipelago: Tuamotus
- Area: 22.2 km^{2} (8.6 sq mi) (lagoon); 9.4 km^{2} (4 sq mi) (above water)
- Length: 8 km (5 mi)
- Width: 3.5 km (2.17 mi)

Administration
- France
- Overseas collectivity: French Polynesia
- Administrative subdivision: Îles Tuamotu-Gambier
- Commune: Fangatau
- Largest settlement: Teana

Demographics
- Population: 150 (2022)
- Pop. density: 16/km^{2} (41/sq mi)

Fangatau
- Commune

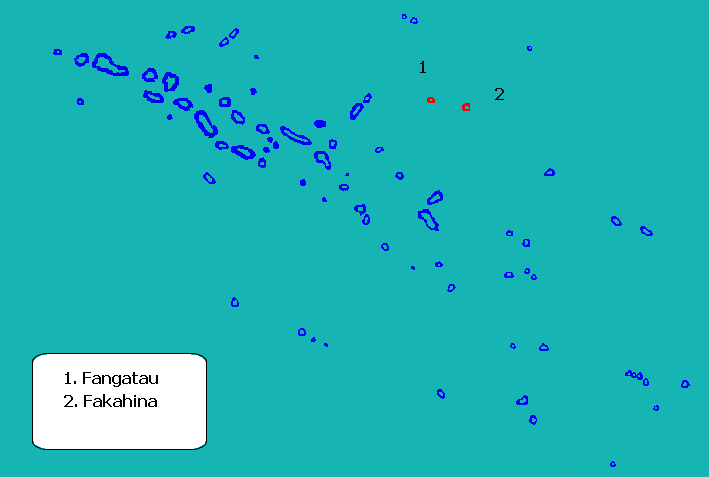
- Location of Fangatau
- Coordinates: 15°49′12″S 140°53′14″W
- Country: France
- Overseas collectivity: French Polynesia
- Subdivision: Îles Tuamotu-Gambier
- Area^{1}: 14.3 km^{2} (5.5 sq mi)
- Population (2022): 323
  - Density: 22.6/km^{2} (58.5/sq mi)
- Time zone: UTC−10:00
- INSEE/Postal code: 98717 /
- ^{1} French Land Register data, which excludes lakes, ponds, glaciers > 1 km^{2} (0.386 sq mi or 247 acres) and river estuaries.

Fangatau, or Nakai-erua, is a small atoll in the Tuamotu group in French Polynesia. The nearest land is Fakahina Atoll, located 72 km to the ESE. This small atoll has an elongated shape. Its length is 8 kilometres (5.0 miles), maximum width 3.5 kilometres (2.2 miles). It has a total area of 22.2 square kilometres (8.6 square miles), land area 5.9 km^{2}. Its reef encloses its lagoon completely. Anchorage is difficult. Fangatau Atoll has 150 inhabitants (2022 census). Teana is the main village.

== History ==
The first recorded European to arrive at Fangatau was Russian explorer Fabian Gottlieb von Bellingshausen on the 10 July 1820 on ships Vostok and Mirni. He named this atoll "Arakcheev". Fangatau was the home of Kamake an Iturangi, regarded by anthropologist Kenneth Emory as "the greatest Tuamotuan sage" he ever met.

== Administration ==
The commune of Fangatau consists of Fangatau Atoll, as well as the atoll and associated commune of Fakahina. The seat of the commune is the village Teana.

Atoll	Main village	Population 2022	Land area (km^{2})	Lagoon (km^{2})	Coordinates
Fangatau	Teana	150	5.9	11	15°49′S 140°52′W
Fakahina	Tarione	173	8.3	20	15°59′S 140°08′W
Commune of Fangatau	Teana	323	14.3	31	

Atoll	Main village	Population 2007	Population 2012	Population 2017
Fangatau	Teana	121	145	135
Fakahina	Tarione	131	155	161
Commune of Fangatau	Teana	252	300	296

== Transport ==
The atoll is served by the Fangatau Airport (IATA: FGU, ICAO: NTGB).

== See also ==
- Fangatau Airport
