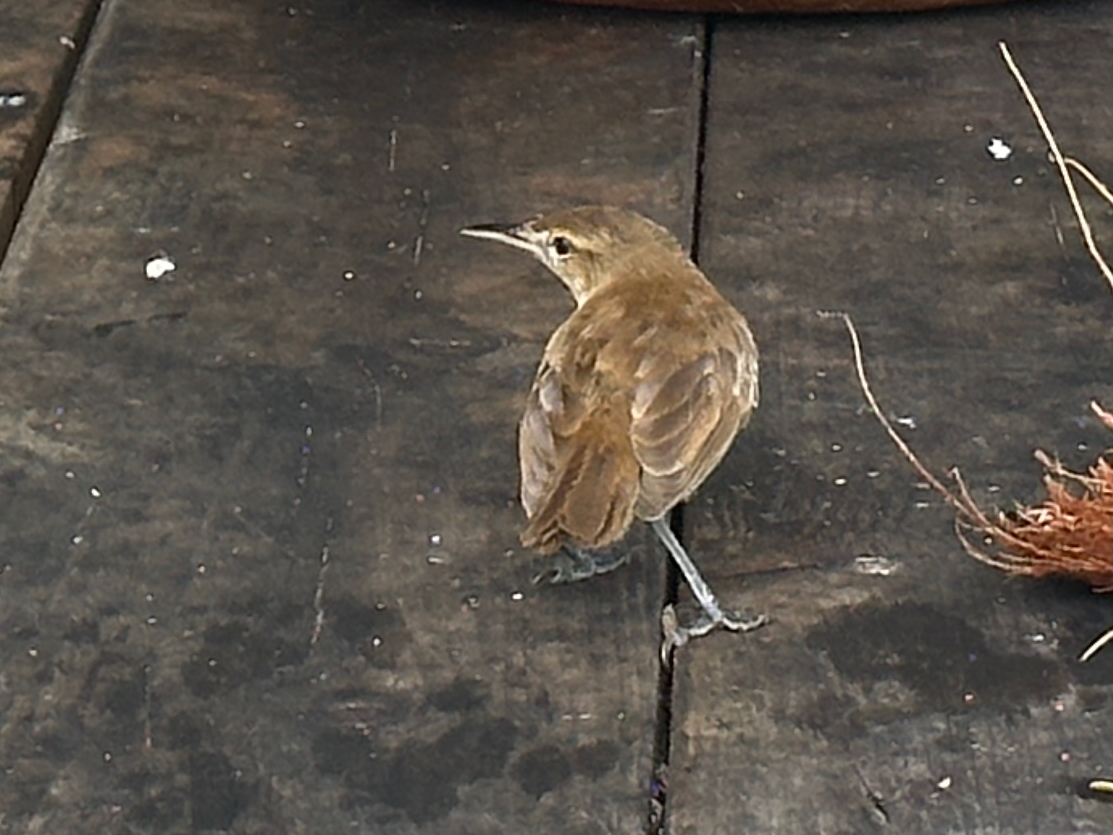

Conservation status
- Least Concern (IUCN 3.1)

Scientific classification
- Kingdom: Animalia
- Phylum: Chordata
- Class: Aves
- Order: Passeriformes
- Family: Acrocephalidae
- Genus: Acrocephalus
- Species: A. atyphus

Binomial name
- Acrocephalus atyphus (Wetmore, 1919)
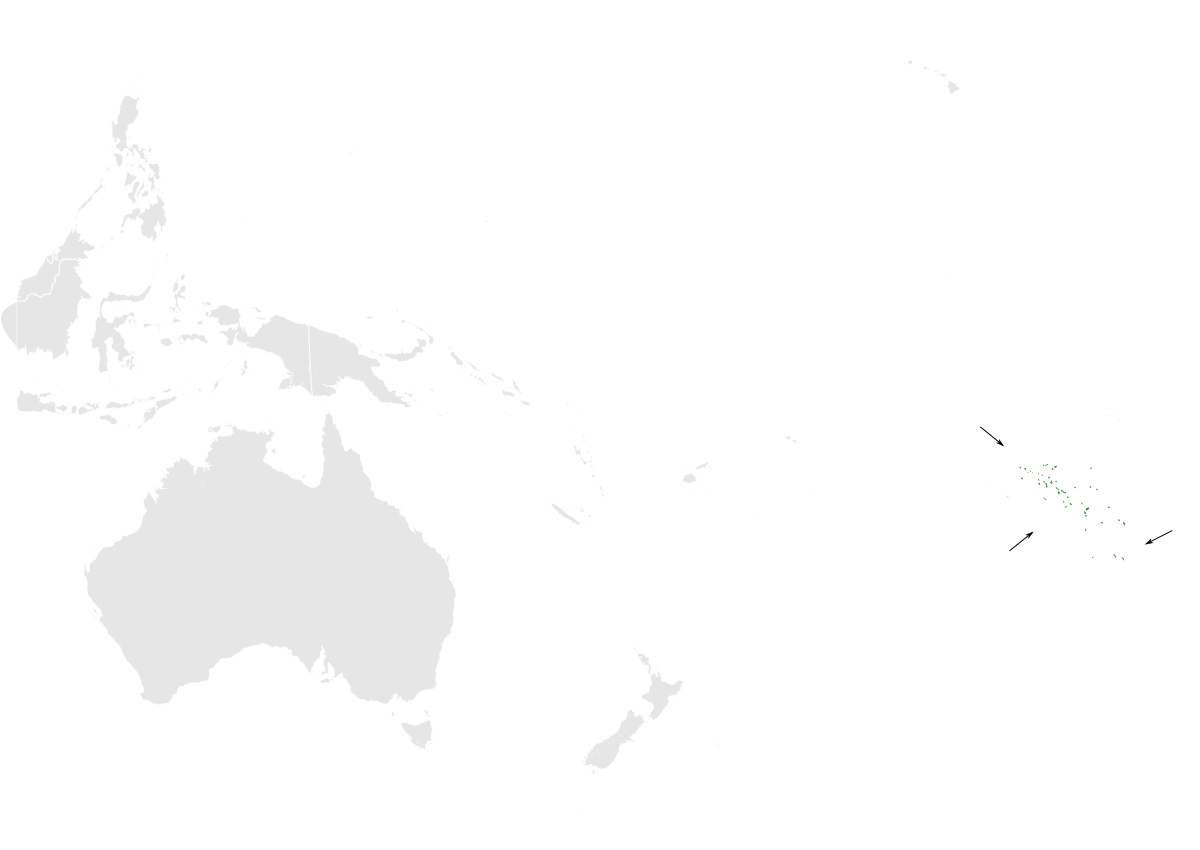

= Tuamotu reed warbler =

Species of bird

The Tuamotu reed warbler (Acrocephalus atyphus) is a species of Old World warbler in the family Acrocephalidae. It is found only in French Polynesia.

== Taxonomy ==
Acrocephalus atyphus includes the following subspecies:

- A. t. atyphus - (Wetmore, 1919)
- A. t. eremus - (Wetmore, 1919)
- A. t. niauensis - (Murphy & Mathews, 1929)
- A. t. palmarum - (Murphy & Mathews, 1929)
- A. t. ravus - (Wetmore, 1919)
- A. t. flavidus - (Murphy & Mathews, 1929)
