= Fakarava =

Atoll in French Polynesia

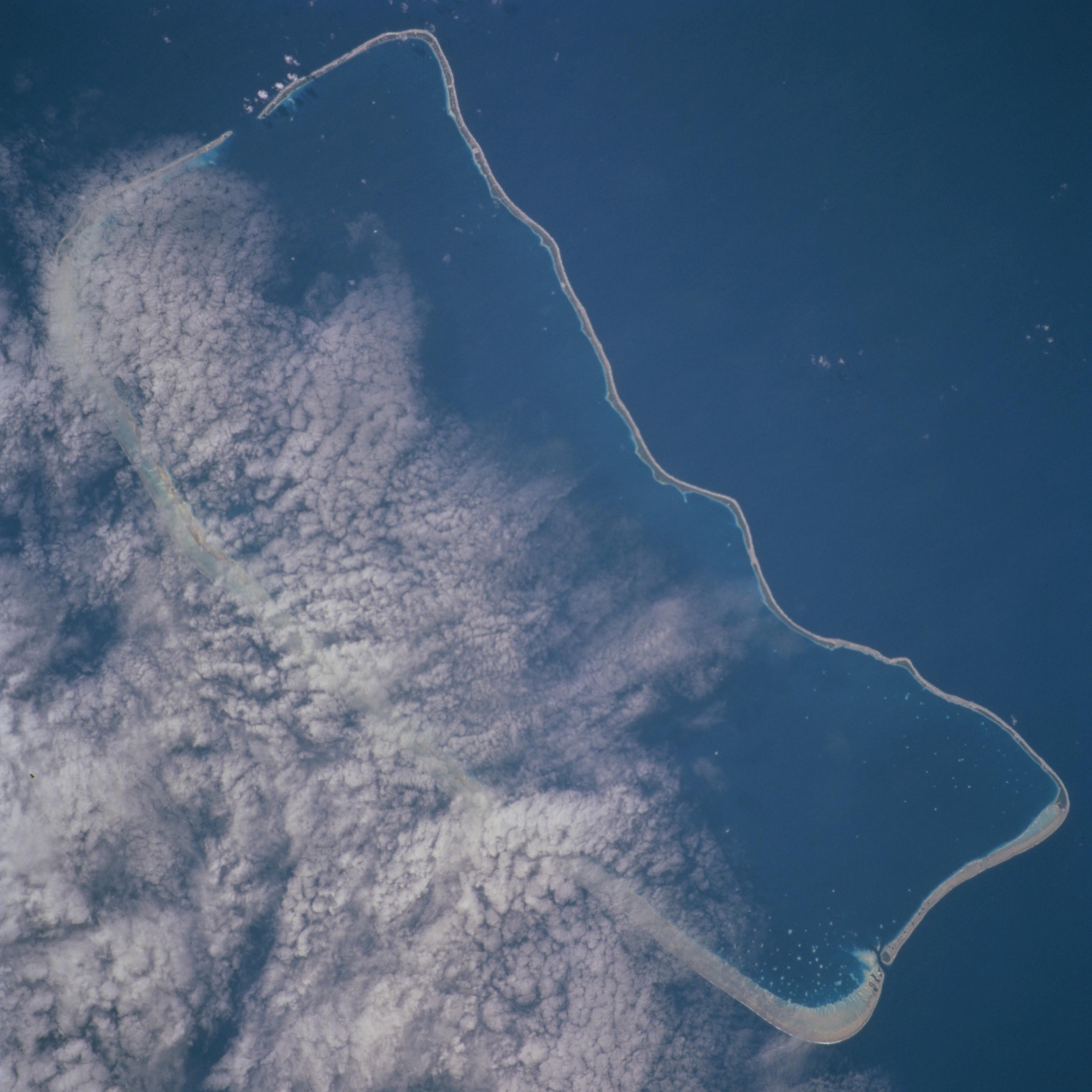
- NASA picture of Fakarava Atoll

- Location within French Polynesia

Geography
- Location: Pacific Ocean
- Coordinates: 16°18′S 145°38′W
- Archipelago: Tuamotus
- Area: 1,112 km^{2} (429 sq mi) (lagoon); 24.1 km^{2} (9 sq mi) (above water)
- Length: 60 km (37 mi)
- Width: 21 km (13 mi)

Administration
- France
- Overseas collectivity: French Polynesia
- Administrative subdivision: Îles Tuamotu-Gambier
- Commune: Fakarava
- Largest settlement: Rotoava

Demographics
- Population: 837 (2016)
- Pop. density: 35/km^{2} (91/sq mi)

Fakarava, Havaiki-te-araro, Havai'i or Farea is an atoll in the west of the Tuamotu group in French Polynesia. It is the second largest of the Tuamotu atolls. The nearest land is Toau, a coral atoll which lies 14 kilometres (8.7 miles) to the northwest.

The atoll is roughly rectangular, and its length is 60 kilometres (37 miles) and its width is 21 kilometres (13 miles). Fakarava has a wide and deep lagoon with a surface of 1,112 square kilometres (429 square miles) and two passes. The main pass to enter the lagoon, located in its north-western end, is known as Passe Garuae and it is the largest pass in French Polynesia; the southern pass is called Tumakohua. It has a land area of 24.1 square kilometres (9 square miles). Fakarava has 837 inhabitants; the main village is called Rotoava.

== History ==
The Pōmare Dynasty originated here before ruling the island of Tahiti. The atoll was first mentioned by a European on 17 July 1820 by the Russian navigator Fabian Gottlieb von Bellingshausen, who gave it the name Wittgenstein Island. It was visited by the British sailor Ireland on 2 October 1831, who mentioned it under the same name, and then on 14 November 1835 by his compatriot Robert FitzRoy, as well as by the French navigator Jules Dumont d'Urville in September 1838.

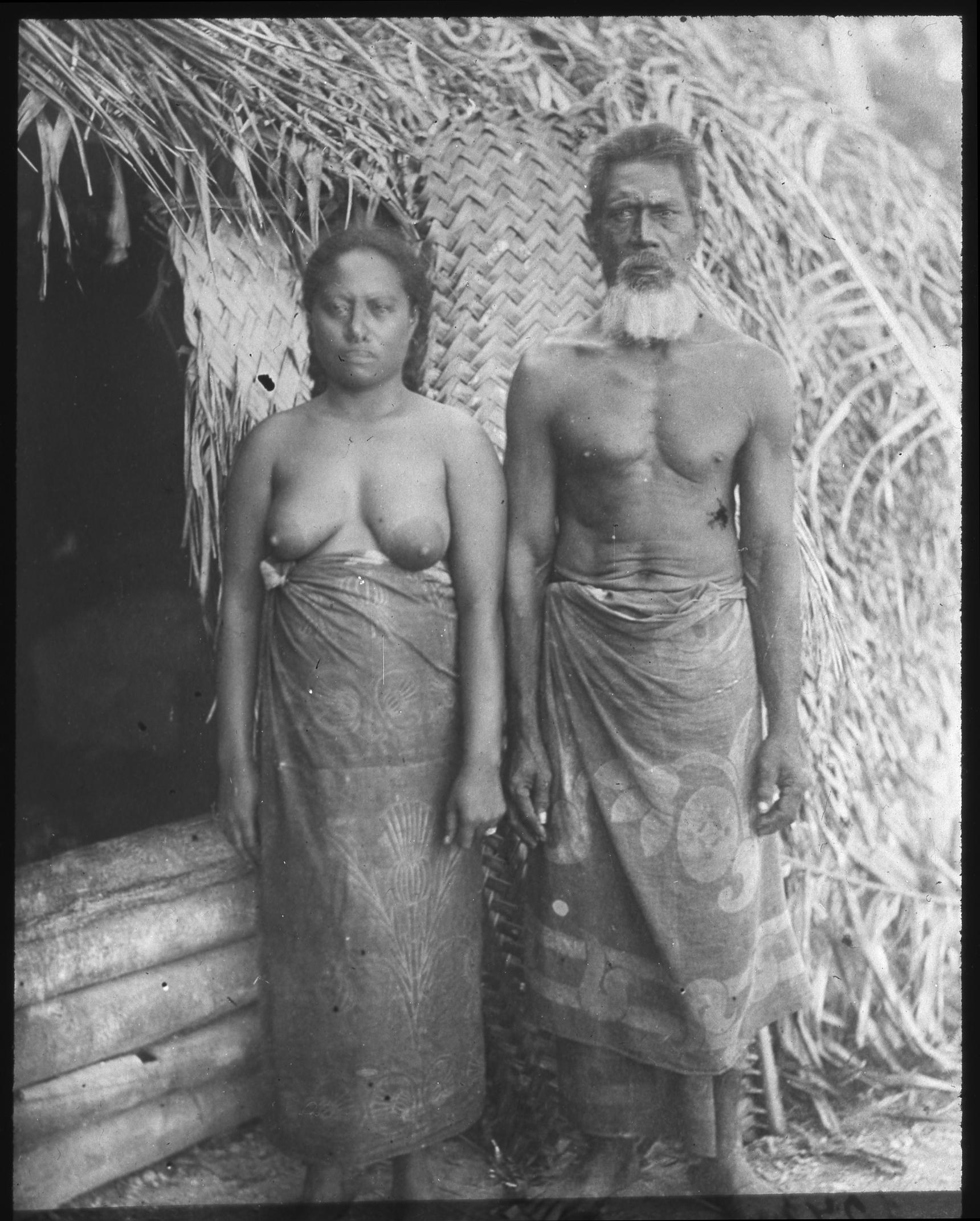
Photograph of Fakarava natives (1884), during the Vanadis expedition

In the 19th century, Fakarava became a French territory with a population of about 375 inhabitants, which developed a small production of coconut oil (about 7 to 8 barrels per year around 1860), but became, due to its geographical position and the seaport offered by its lagoon, one of the main centers of trade in this resource and of mother-of-pearl production. The atoll was evangelized by Honoré Laval, a Catholic priest, in 1849: the Rotoava church was blessed in 1850, and the Tetamanu church, dating from 1874, was built in coral.

At the beginning of the 20th century, the atoll was divided into two districts: Tehatea and Tetamanu. In 2016, Fakarava became part of the UNESCO Biosphere Reserve created in 1977.

== Geography ==
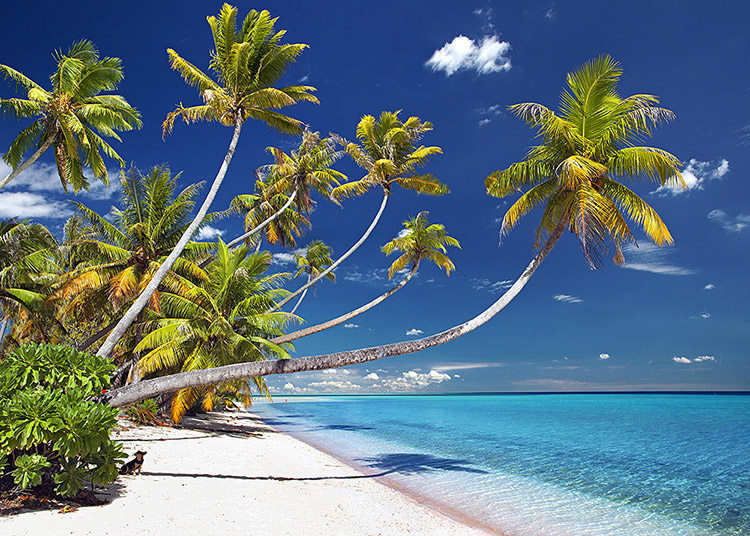
Hirifa Beach, Fakarava

Fakarava is a rectangular atoll 60 km (37 mi) long and 21 km (13 mi) wide. It is the second largest atoll in the Tuamotu, after Rangiroa, with an area of 21.4 km^{2} (8.3 sq mi) and a lagoon of 1,121 km^{2} (433 sq mi). Fakarava is located 450 km (280 mi) northeast of Tahiti. Its lagoon is the second largest in French Polynesia (after Rangiroa) and covers 1,121 km^{2}. It is accessible through two passes: Garuae (to the north), the largest pass in French Polynesia 1.37 km (0.85 mi); and Tumakohua, also called Tetamanu (south). Garuae is very rich in marine fauna, with rays, manta rays, barracudas, groupers, turtles and dolphins. It is an important center of sports diving.

The main village is Rotoava, located to the northeast near the Garuae Passage. In the southern pass is the village of Tetamanu, the former capital of the island and residence of the administrator of the Tuamotu during the 19th century. The total population was 806 at the 2012 census.

=== Geology ===
Geologically, the atoll is 150-metre (490 ft) tall coral outgrowth from the top of a very small volcanic seamount of the same name, measuring 1,170 m (3,840 ft) from the seafloor, formed some 53.7–59.6 million years ago.

=== Demography ===
The total population was 806 inhabitants in the 2012 census, which increased to 844 people according to 2017 data.

1983	1988	1996	2002	2007	2012	2017
224	248	467	712	852	824	844

=== Religion ===
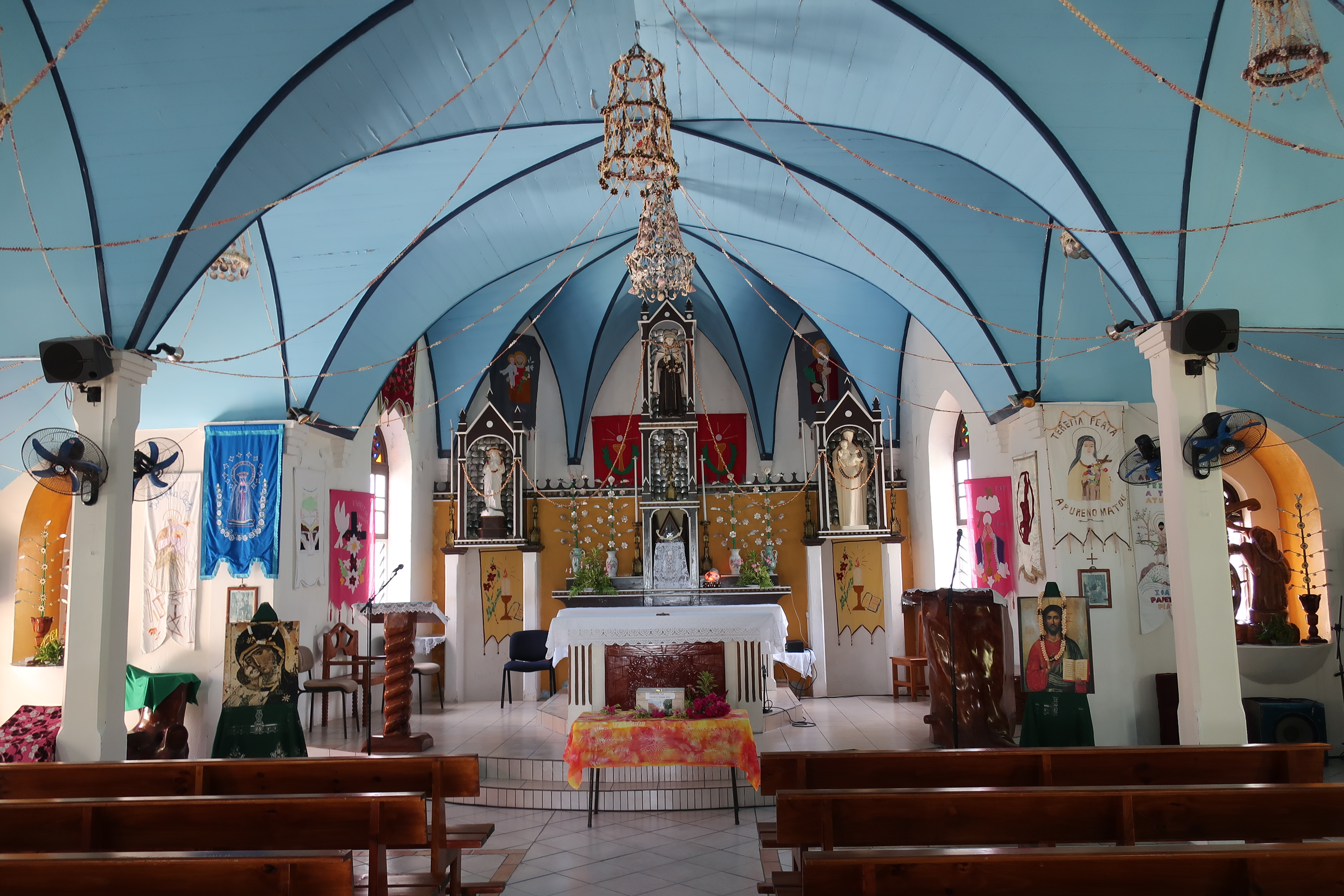
Church of Saint John of the Cross (Église de Saint-Jean-de-la-Croix)

The majority of the Atoll's population is Christian as a result of missionary activity by both Catholic and Protestant groups. The Catholic Church administers a religious building in Rotoava, the Church of Saint John of the Cross (Église de Saint-Jean-de-la-Croix) that depends on the Metropolitan Archdiocese of Papeete with headquarters in Tahiti. The church, as its name indicates, is dedicated to a Spanish mystic saint who founded the Order of the Discalced Carmelites (Ordo Fratrum Discalceatorum Beatissimae Mariae Virginis de Monte Carmelo).

== Wildlife ==
Like all the other islands in the archipelago, Fakarava has some of the most pristine and undisturbed coral reef ecosystems in the world. The south pass of Fakarava has been protected since 2008 and is now home to the highest concentration of Grey reef sharks, in the world with an estimated 700 sharks comprising the single school that inhabits the area. This is also one of the only reefs where sharks are fully protected and can be found in anything like their historical numbers.

== Economy ==
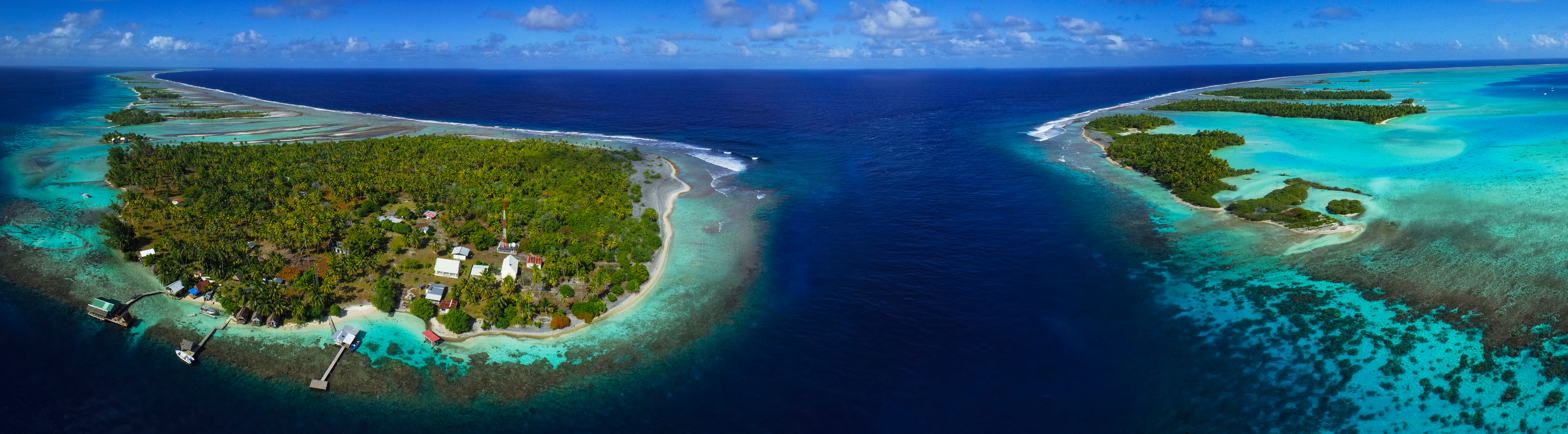
South Pass of Fakarava atoll

Fakarava is developing a pearl farming activity – authorized on 400 ha (990 acres) (and 50 spat collection lines) in the northeastern part of the lagoon, near Rotoava – and sea cucumber fishing in the eastern part of the lagoon for export to Asia.

The atoll has an airfield with a runway 1.4 km (0.87 mi) long, which allows the development of tourism in all the atolls attached to the commune of Fakarava. On average, it receives about 850 flights and between 25,000 and 30,000 passengers per year, of which 20% are in transit, making it one of the busiest in French Polynesia.

The landing of the Natitua submarine cable and its commissioning in December 2018 allow Fakarava to be connected to Tahiti and to global high-speed Internet.

The development of tourism, with the construction of a hotel, has increased the population in recent years. In addition to tourism around diving, the economy is based on copra mining and mother-of-pearl farming.

== Scientific expeditions ==
Laurent Ballesta's team has conducted two scientific expeditions in Fakarava, within the framework of the Gombessa expeditions.

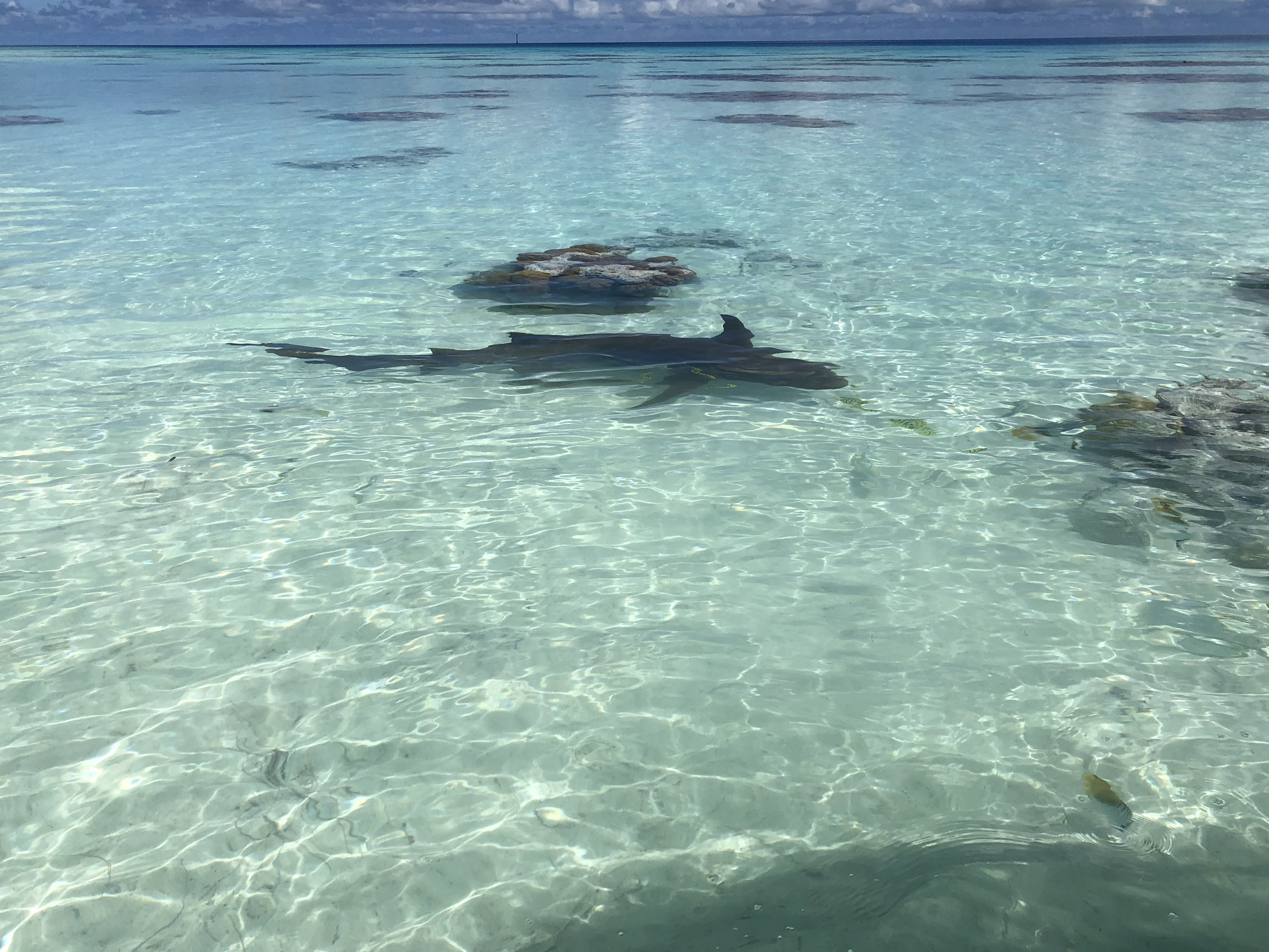
Sleeper shark, Ohavana beach, Fakarava

Gombessa 2, conducted in Fakarava in 2014, on the reproduction of marbled groupers of the species Epinephelus polyphekadion, in particular their gathering and behavior before and especially during the annual spawning of females at the exit of the Tumakohua pass (the one in the south of the lagoon) during the two full moons of June and July.

Gombessa 4, conducted in 2017, is a continuation of the previous one and focuses on the unusual density of gray reef sharks (more than 700) in the same Tumakohua pass during the same period. The mission studied the social organization of sharks within a horde.

== In literature ==
- London, Jack (1911) [1909]. "The Seed of McCoy". South Sea Tales. The Macmillan Company – via en.wikisource.org.
- James Norman Hall describes his visit to Fakarava, and the prior visit of Captain Bligh to the atoll, in "The Tale of a Shipwreck," published 1934.
