= Îles Tuamotu-Gambier =

Administrative division in French Polynesia

Coordinates: 18°02′S 141°25′W

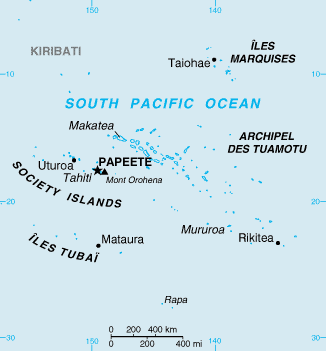

The Îles Tuamotu-Gambier (French: Îles Tuamotu-Gambier or Archipels des Tuamotu et des Gambier or Archipel des Tuamotu-Gambier or Tuamotu-Gambier or officially subdivision administrative des (Îles) Tuamotu-Gambier) is an administrative division in French Polynesia. It consists of the Tuamotus and the Gambier Islands which are geographically located closely together.

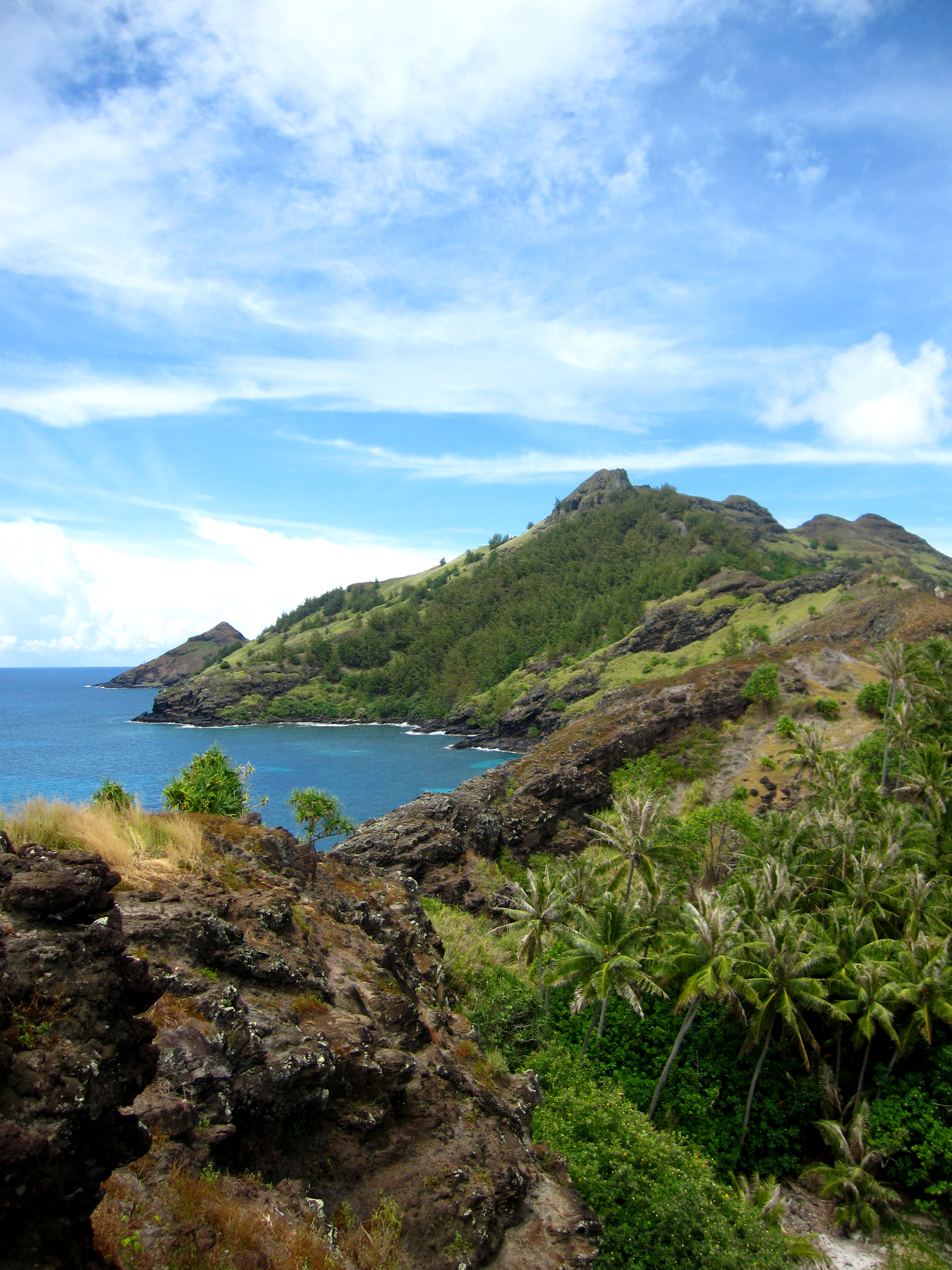
Akamaru, Gambier Islands

Because of a difference between administrative districts and electoral circumscriptions on the Îles Tuamotu-Gambier, French Polynesia has 5 administrative subdivisions (French: subdivisions administratives), but 6 electoral districts/electoral circumscriptions (French: circonscriptions électorales). It has an area of 726.5 square kilometers and an estimated population of 16,881 people according to data from 2017.

== Administrative division ==
Administratively, the Îles Tuamotu-Gambier form one of the 5 administrative subdivisions (subdivision administratives) of French Polynesia, the administrative subdivision of the Tuamotu-Gambier (Islands) (subdivision administrative des (Îles) Tuamotu-Gambier) with 17 communes: The 16 communes Anaa, Arutua, Fakarava, Fangatau, Hao, Hikueru, Makemo, Manihi, Napuka, Nukutavake, Puka-Puka, Rangiroa, Reao, Takaroa-Takapoto, Tatakoto and Tureia of the Tuamotus and the commune Gambier, comprising the Gambier Islands, the Acteon Group, and a few atolls.

== Electoral divisions ==
Whereas all other 4 administrative subdivisions (subdivisions administratives) of French Polynesia are at the same time also electoral districts/electoral circumscriptions (circonscriptions électorales) for the Assembly of French Polynesia (Assemblée de la Polynésie française), the Îles Tuamotu-Gambier are the only administrative district of French Polynesia that is not identical with an electoral district/electoral circumscription, but consists of 2 different electoral districts/electoral circumscriptions for the Assembly of French Polynesia.

These 2 electoral districts/electoral circumscriptions (circonscriptions électorales) are:

- electoral circumscription of the Gambier Islands and the Islands Tuamotu-East (circonscription des Îles Gambier et Tuamotu Est) with 12 communes: The commune Gambier on the Gambier Islands and the 11 communes Anaa, Fangatau, Hao, Hikueru, Makemo, Napuka, Nukutavake, Pukapuka, Reao, Tatakoto and Tureia in the eastern part of the Tuamotus.
- electoral circumscription of the Islands Tuamotu-West (circonscription des Îles Tuamotu Ouest) with the 5 communes Arutua, Fakarava, Manihi, Rangiroa and Takaroa in the western part of the Tuamotus.

== See also ==
- French overseas departments and territories
- Administrative divisions of France
