= Napuka Airport =

Airport in French Polynesia

- IATA: NAU; ICAO: NTGN

Summary
- Airport type: Public
- Operator: DSEAC Polynésie française
- Serves: Tepukamaruia, Napuka, Tuamotus, French Polynesia
- Elevation AMSL: 5 m (16 ft)
- Coordinates: 14°10′36″S 141°16′01″W

Map
- Location of the airport in French Polynesia

Runways
Direction	Length		Surface
Direction	m	ft	Surface
10/28	900	2,953	Bitumen
- Sources: AIP, GCM, STV

Napuka Airport (IATA: NAU, ICAO: NTGN) is an airport on the atoll of Napuka, part of the Tuamotu Archipelago in French Polynesia. The airport is adjacent to the village of Tepukamaruia.

== Airlines and destinations ==
Air Tahiti connects Napuka Airport to Fakahina atoll, Fangatau Airport, Faaʼa International Airport (Papeete), Puka-Puka Airport, and Raroia Airport.

== See also ==
- List of airports in French Polynesia
