= Air Tahiti =

Regional airline from French Polynesia

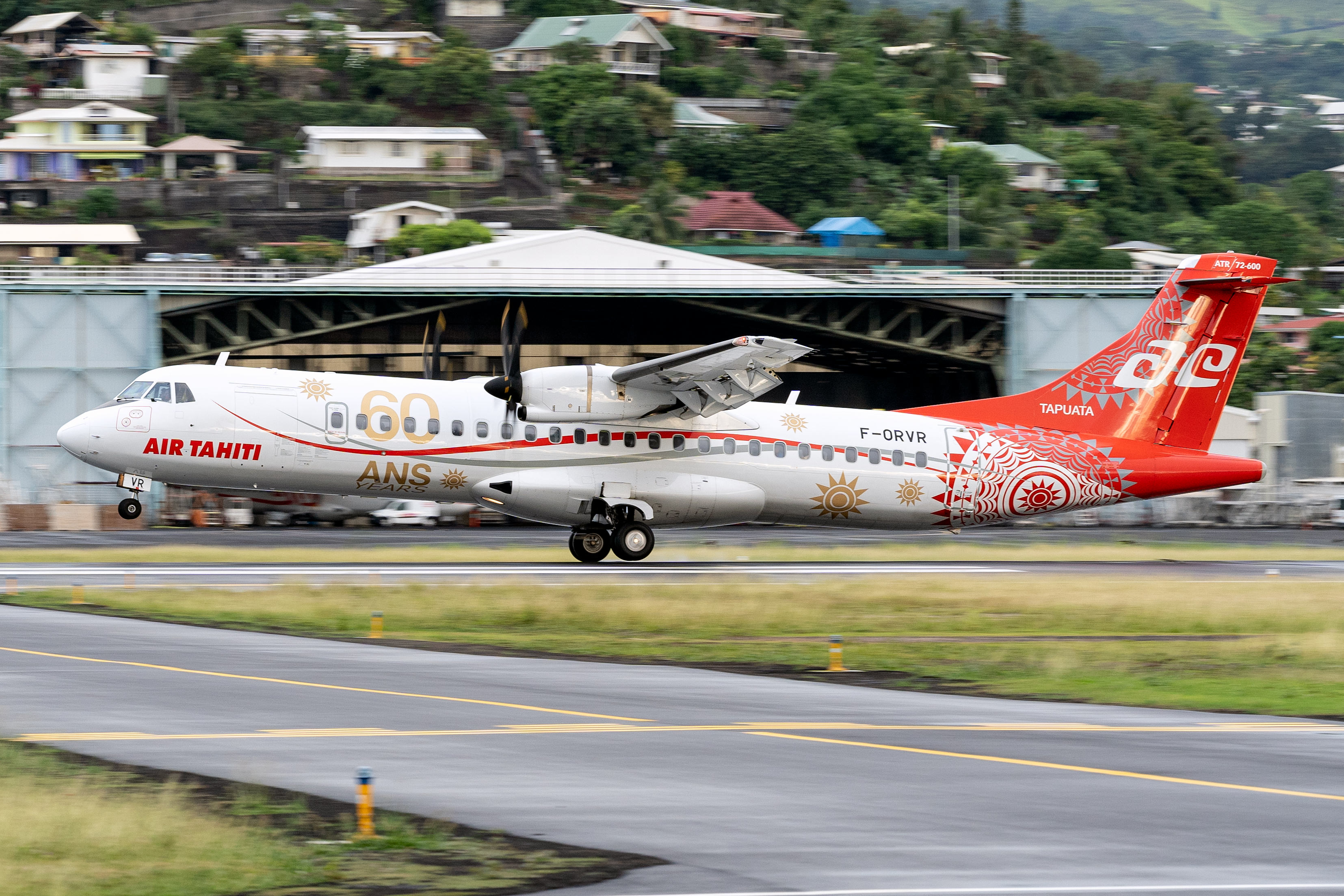
- Air Tahiti ATR 72 in the 60 Years Livery at Faaʼa International Airport
IATA	ICAO	Call sign
VT	VTA	AIR TAHITI
- Founded: 1950; 76 years ago
- Hubs: Faaʼa International Airport (Papeete)
- Alliance: None
- Fleet size: 12
- Destinations: 48
- Parent company: Government of French Polynesia
- Headquarters: Faaʼa International Airport; Faaʼa, Tahiti, French Polynesia
- Key people: James Estall (CEO); Manate Vivish (General Manager)
- Website: www.airtahiti.com

Air Tahiti is a French regional airline which operates in French Polynesia. Its main hub is Faaʼa International Airport, where the company head office is. With 48 destinations, the airline is the largest private employer in French Polynesia.

== Company history ==
=== Early seaplane operations ===
The company was founded in July 1950 by Jean Arbelot and Marcel Lasserre, operating between Papeete, Raiatea, and Bora Bora using a 7-seater seaplane, a Grumman Widgeon J-4F.

In 1951, the French Ministry for the Overseas purchased on behalf of the Territory a Grumman Mallard amphibian aircraft, which the airline was allowed to use. In May 1951, it inaugurated a fortnightly mail service between Papeete and Aitutaki in the Cook Islands, only for the first flight to be turned away due to concerns about Polio. The route was discontinued in June 1952 when TEAL extended its service to Papeete. The airline temporarily ceased all operations in July 1952 after a crash injured its only pilot, but services resumed in April 1953 after an Australian pilot was recruited. Gradually, Air Tahiti spread its wings to all the islands of French Polynesia. In 1953, the first landing in the Gambier archipelago was achieved. In October 1953, the first flight to the Marquesas islands took place with a sea-landing at Taiohae / Nuku Hiva.

=== RAI ===
In July 1953, the Territory reallocated the Grumman Mallard to Régie Aérienne Interinsulaire (RAI, "interisland aviation board"), a subsidiary of Transports Aériens Intercontinentaux, which took over air transport in French Polynesia. The Air Tahiti brand then disappeared. RAI acquired two Consolidated PBY Catalina seaplanes to expand links between the islands of French Polynesia. Originally operating in an orange livery, these aircraft later adopted green and blue. The network was expanded, and in 1955, the Austral archipelagos inaugurated seaplane service with the opening of routes to Tubuai and Raivavae.

In 1958, RAI rebranded as the Réseau Aérien Interinsulaire (Inter-Island Aviation Network). It continued to operate seaplanes, and expanded its network to include the Tuamotus. It also operated a Short Sandringham "Bermuda" flying boat connecting the main runway at Bora-Bora with Papeete. The construction of Papeete's Faa'a International Airport in 1960 was followed by a vast construction program of runways across French Polynesia, and RAI's fleet shifted away from seaplanes towards conventional aircraft.

=== Air Polynésie ===
In 1970, RAI rebranded again as Air Polynésie. Nicknamed "Air Po" by Polynesians, the company asserted more of its Polynesian identity and implemented regular services throughout French Polynesia and especially to the more remote islands. The airline had a "virtual monopoly" due to a convention with the territorial government. Initially operating a Short Sandringham "Bermuda" flying boat, a Douglas DC-4 propliner and a de Havilland Canada DHC-6 Twin Otter turboprop, it later added a Britten-Norman BN-2 Islander and two Fokker F27 Friendships. It began operations to Huahine in April 1971. In late 1984, faced with a need for new capital to purchase modern aircraft, it threatened to wind itself up unless a loan was guaranteed by the territorial government.

=== Air Tahiti again ===
In 1985, the former UTA (by then absorbed by Air France) sold a majority of Air Polynesia shares, with 25% being given to the French Polynesian government and the remaining 45% sold to local investors. In 1987, the airline was again rebranded as Air Tahiti, using a fleet of ATR 42 regional turboprop aircraft. Between 1987 and 2007, it quadrupled its passenger-kilometres travelled, from 75 million to 315 million.

== Destinations ==
Air Tahiti covers a network of 48 destinations, most of which are in French Polynesia, although one is available in the Cook Islands.

Country	City	Airport	Notes
Cook Islands	Rarotonga	Rarotonga International Airport	
French Polynesia	Bora Bora	Bora Bora Airport	
French Polynesia	Huahine	Huahine - Fare Airport	
French Polynesia	Maupiti	Maupiti Airport	
French Polynesia	Moorea	Moorea Airport	
French Polynesia	Raiatea	Raiatea Airport	
French Polynesia	Tahiti	Faa'a International Airport	Hub
French Polynesia	Ahe	Ahe Airport	
French Polynesia	Aratika	Aratika Airport	
French Polynesia	Arutua	Arutua Airport	
French Polynesia	Faaite	Faaite Airport	
French Polynesia	Fakarava	Fakarava Airport	
French Polynesia	Katiu	Katiu Airport	
French Polynesia	Kauehi	Kauehi Aerodome	
French Polynesia	Kaukura	Kaukura Airport	
French Polynesia	Manihi	Manihi Airport	
French Polynesia	Mataiva	Mataiva Airport	
French Polynesia	Niau	Niau Airport	
French Polynesia	Rangiroa	Rangiroa Airport	
French Polynesia	Takapoto	Takapoto Airport	
French Polynesia	Takaroa	Takaroa Airport	
French Polynesia	Tikehau	Tikehau Airport	
French Polynesia	Anaa	Anaa Airport	
French Polynesia	Fangatau	Fangatau Airport	
French Polynesia	Hao	Hao Airport	
French Polynesia	Hikueru	Hikueru Airport	
French Polynesia	Mangareva	Totegegie Airport	
French Polynesia	Makemo	Makemo Airport	
French Polynesia	Napuka	Napuka Airport	
French Polynesia	Nukutavake	Nukutavake Airport	
French Polynesia	Pukarua	Pukarua Airport	
French Polynesia	Raroia	Raroia Airport	
French Polynesia	Reao	Reao Airport	
French Polynesia	Tatakoto	Tatakoto Airport	
French Polynesia	Tureia	Tureia Airport	
French Polynesia	Vahitahi	Vahitahi Airport	
French Polynesia	Hiva Oa	Atuona Airport	
French Polynesia	Nuku Hiva	Nuku Hiva Airport	
French Polynesia	Ua Huka	Ua Huka Airport	
French Polynesia	Ua Pou	Ua Pou Airport	
French Polynesia	Raivavae	Raivavae Airport	
French Polynesia	Rimatara	Rimatara Airport	
French Polynesia	Rurutu	Rurutu Airport	
French Polynesia	Tubuai	Tubuai – Mataura Airport	
French Polynesia	Apataki	Apataki Airport	
French Polynesia	Fakahina	Fakahina Airfield	
French Polynesia	Puka-Puka	Puka-Puka Airport	
French Polynesia	Takume	Takume Airport	

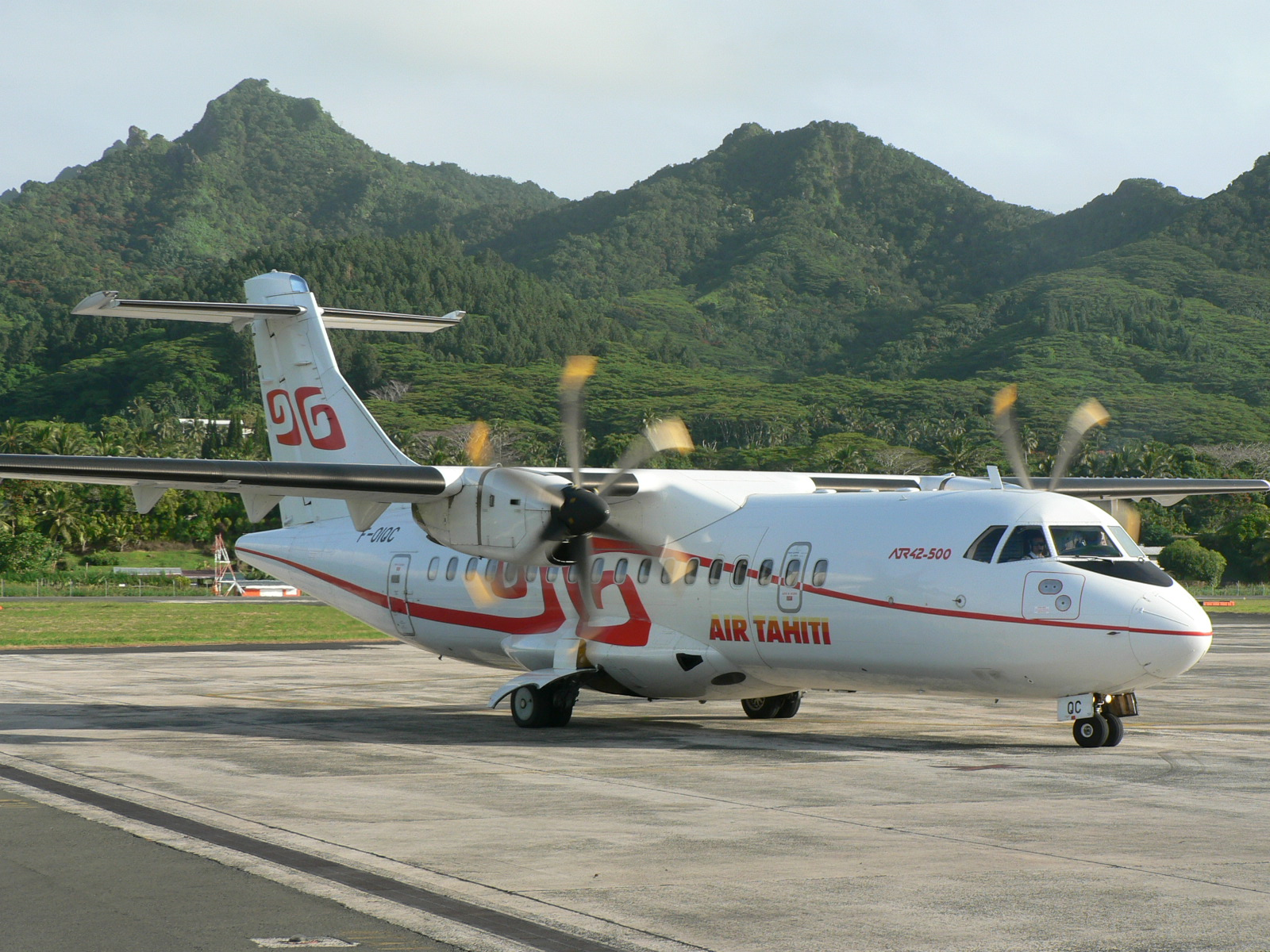
Air Tahiti ATR 42-500 at Rarotonga International Airport (2012)

=== Codeshare agreements ===
Air Tahiti has codeshare agreements with the following airlines:

- Air Rarotonga
- Air Tahiti Nui

=== Interline agreements ===
Air Tahiti also has an interline agreement with French Bee.

== Fleet ==
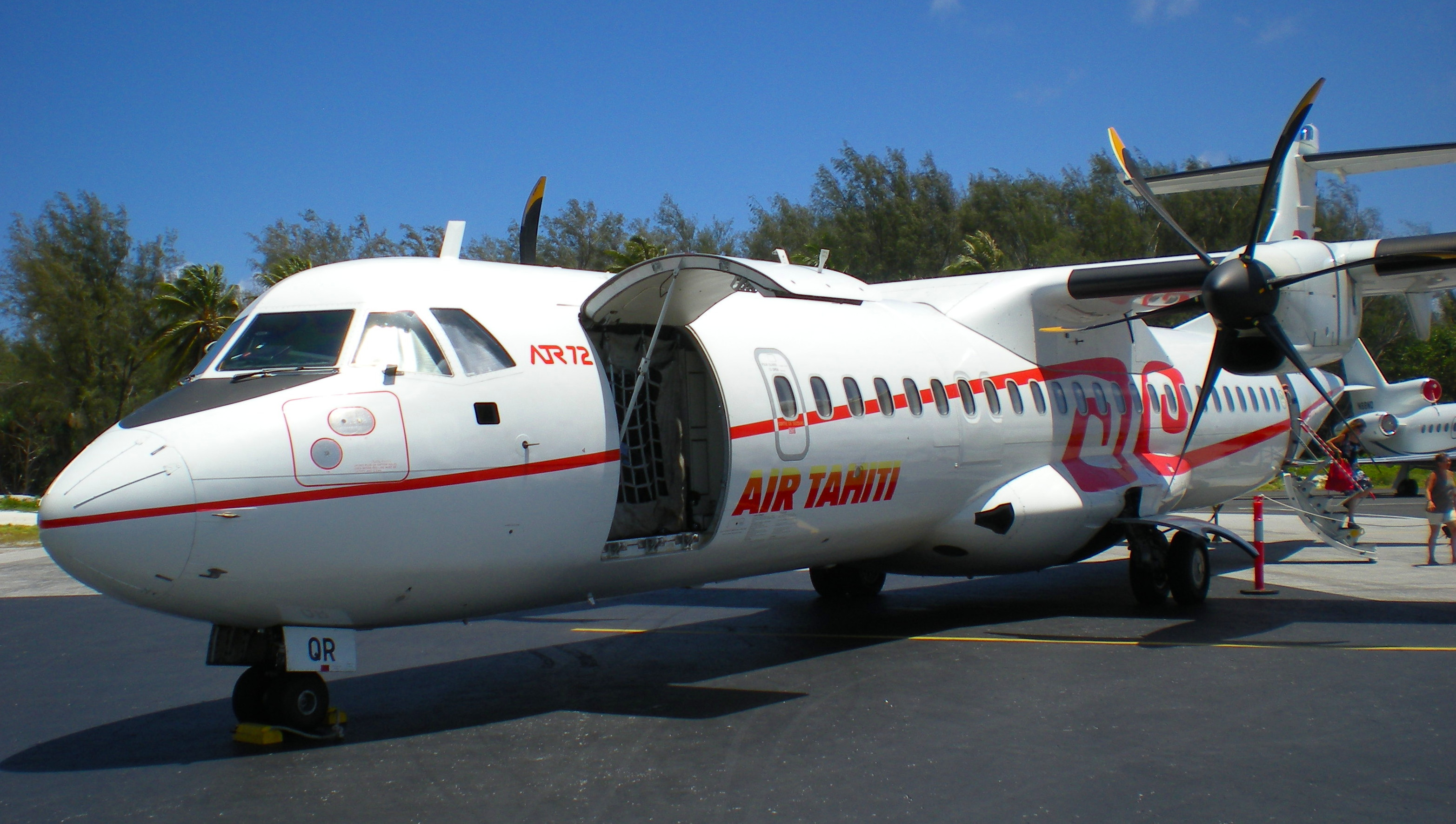
Air Tahiti ATR 72 F-OIQR at Bora Bora Airport

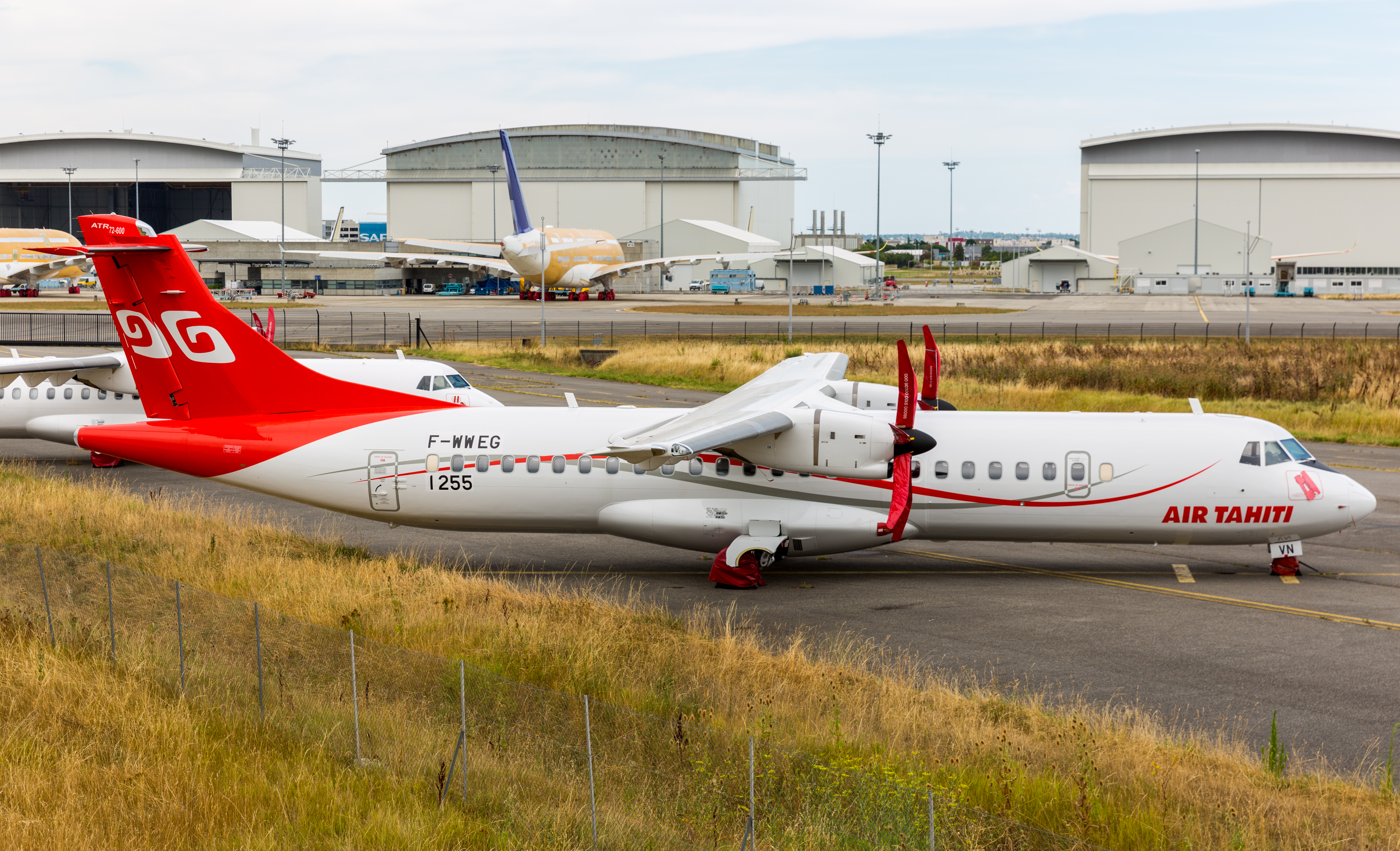
Air Tahiti ATR 72-600 at Toulouse-Blagnac Airport (2015)

=== Current fleet ===
As of July 2026, Air Tahiti operates the following aircraft:

Air Tahiti fleet
Aircraft	In Service	Order	Passengers	Notes
ATR 42-600	2	2	48	STOL-capable variant will replace existing fleet in 2025.
ATR 72-600	10	4	70	Deliveries from 2025.
Total	12	6		

=== Former fleet ===
As of August 2025, Air Tahiti operated 2 ATR 42-600, 10 ATR 72-600 and 1 Twin Otter.

== Accidents and incidents ==
- On April 18, 1991, Air Tahiti Flight 805 was on approach to Nuku Hiva Airport, when the aircraft, a Dornier 228, suffered an engine failure and attempted to ditch near the coast. 10 of the 22 occupants in the aircraft were killed.
