= Puka-Puka Airport =

Airport in French Polynesia

Puka Puka Airport
- IATA: PKP; ICAO: NTGP

Summary
- Serves: Puka-Puka
- Elevation AMSL: 5 ft (1.5 m)
- Coordinates: 14°48′33.5″S 138°48′39.2″W

Map
- Location of the airport in French Polynesia

Runways
Direction	Length		Surface
Direction	ft	m	Surface
10/28	3,051	1,004	Asphalt

Puka-Puka Airport is an airport on Puka-Puka in French Polynesia (IATA: PKP, ICAO: NTGP). The airport is 3 km northeast of the village of Teonemahina. The airport is extremely vulnerable to climate change caused sea level rise. The airport only sits 1.5 meters in elevation above sea level, so even with low end climate model predictions, the airport is likely to be flooded.

== Airlines and destinations ==
Air Tahiti connects Puka-Puka Airport to Fakahina atoll, Fangatau Airport, Makemo Airport, Faaʼa International Airport (Papeete), and Raroia Airport.

== See also ==
- List of airports in French Polynesia
