= List of airports in French Polynesia =

This is a list of airports in French Polynesia, sorted by location.

French Polynesia (French: Polynésie française) is an overseas territory (territoire d'outre-mer or TOM) of France with the particular designation of overseas country (pays d'outre-mer or POM) in the southern Pacific Ocean. It is made up of several groups of Polynesian islands, the most famous island being Tahiti in the Society Islands group, which is also the most populous island, and the seat of the capital of the territory (Papeete).

== Airports ==
ICAO location identifiers are linked to each airport's Aeronautical Information Publication (AIP), which are available online in Portable Document Format (PDF) from the French Service d'information aéronautique (SIA). Locations shown in bold are as per the airport's AIP page. Most airports give two locations: the first is the city served, second is the city where the airport is located.

Airport names shown in bold have scheduled commercial airline service.

City served / Location	ICAO	IATA	Airport name	Total passengers 2011	Total passengers 2016
**Ahe** (Tenukupara)	NTHE	AHE	**Ahe Airport**	7,011	8,898
**Anaa** (Tukuhora)	NTGA	AAA	Anaa Airport	4,236	3,265
**Apataki**	NTGD	APK	Apataki Airport	2,015	1,572
**Aratika** (3 km NW Paparara)	NTKK	RKA	Aratika Airport	3,058	2,308
**Aratika** (15 km SW Paparara)	NTGR		Aratika-Perles Airport		
**Arutua** (Rautini)	NTGU	AXR	**Arutua Airport**	7,408	9,771
**Bora Bora** (Motu Mute)	NTTB	BOB	**Bora Bora Airport** (Motu-Mute Airport)	254,967	285,639
**Faaite** (Hitianau)	NTKF	FAC	Faaite Airport	2,034	2,374
**Fakahina**	NTKH	FHZ	**Fakahina Airfield**		
**Fakarava** (Rotoava)	NTGF	FAV	**Fakarava Airport**	27,241	28,545
**Fangatau** (Teana)	NTGB	FGU	**Fangatau Airport**	1,840	1,284
**Hao** (Otepa)	NTTO	HOI	**Hao Airport**	15,917	12,667
**Hikueru** (Tupapati)	NTGH	HHZ	**Hikueru Airport**	1,732	1,979
**Hiva Oa** / Atuona	NTMN	AUQ	**Atuona Airport**	28,569	30,631
**Huahine** / Fare	NTTH	HUH	**Huahine - Fare Airport**	144,355	122,980
**Katiu**	NTKT	KXU	Katiu Airport	3,092	2,809
**Kauehi** (Tearavero)	NTKA	KHZ	**Kauehi Aerodrome**	2,871	2,810
**Kaukura** (Raitahiti)	NTGK	KKR	Kaukura Airport	4,774	3,259
**Makemo** (Pouheva)	NTGM	MKP	**Makemo Airport**	11,319	8,838
**Manihi** (Paeva)	NTGI	XMH	**Manihi Airport**	15,689	8,501
**Mataiva** (Pahua)	NTGV	MVT	**Mataiva Airport**	8,313	8,061
**Maupiti**	NTTP	MAU	**Maupiti Airport**	18,539	23,006
**Moorea** / Temae (Afareitu)	NTTM	MOZ	**Moorea Airport**	99,001	83,213
**Napuka** (Tepukamaruia)	NTGN	NAU	**Napuka Airport**	2,199	1,346
**Nengonengo** (Tuamotus)	NTGG	FAV	Nengonengo Airfield		
**Niau** (Tupana)	NTKN	NIU	**Niau Airport**	2,254	3,028
**Nuku Hiva** (Taoihae)	NTMD	NHV	**Nuku Hiva Airport**	42,492	40,335
**Nukutavake** (Tavava)	NTGW	NUK	Nukutavake Airport	1,297	1,144
**Puka-Puka** (Teonemahina)	NTGP	PKP	**Puka-Puka Airport**		1,068
**Pukarua**	NTGQ	PUK	Pukarua Airport	2,359	1,757
**Raiatea** / Uturoa	NTTR	RFP	**Raiatea Airport**	202,643	217,031
**Raivavae** (Rairua)	NTAV	RVV	**Raivavae Airport**	10,911	10,913
**Rangiroa** (Avatoru)	NTTG	RGI	**Rangiroa Airport**	75,811	78,575
**Raroia** (Garumaoa)	NTKO	RRR	**Raroia Airport**	2,496	2,399
**Reao** (Tapuarava)	NTGE	REA	Reao Airport	2,477	2,036
**Rimatara**		RMT	**Rimatara Airport**	10,659	9,802
**Rurutu** (Moerai)	NTAR	RUR	**Rurutu Airport**	23,322	20,263
**Tahiti** / Faa'a (Papeete)	NTAA	PPT	**Tahiti - Faa'a International Airport**	1,169,819	1,243,631
**Takapoto** (Fakatopatere)	NTGT	TKP	**Takapoto Airport**	3,105	2,735
**Takaroa**	NTKR	TKX	**Takaroa Airport**	8,264	6,674
**Takume** (Ohomo)	NTKM	TJN	Takume Airport		
**Tatakoto**	NTGO	TKV	**Tatakoto Airport**	2,339	1,989
**Tetiꞌaroa**	NTTE	TTI	Tetiꞌaroa Airstrip		
**Tikehau** (Tuherahera)	NTGC	TIH	**Tikehau Airport**	36,465	41,731
**Totegegie** (Rikitea)	NTGJ	GMR	**Totegegie Airport**	7,003	7,675
**Tubuai** / Mataura	NTAT	TUB	**Tubuai - Mataura Airport**	22,326	20,635
**Tureia** (Fakamaru)	NTGY	ZTA	Tureia Airport	2,928	2,502
**Ua Huka** (Hane)	NTMU	UAH	**Ua Huka Airport**	6,591	4,031
**Ua Pou** (Hakahau)	NTMP	UAP	**Ua Pou Airport**	8,915	7,444
**Vahitahi** (Mohitu)	NTUV	VHZ	Vahitahi Airport	2,339	45,956

== See also ==
- List of airports in France
- List of airports by ICAO code: N#NT - French Polynesia
- Wikipedia:Airline destination lists: Oceania#French Polynesia (France)
