= Air Tahiti Flight 805 =

1991 aviation incident in French Polynesia

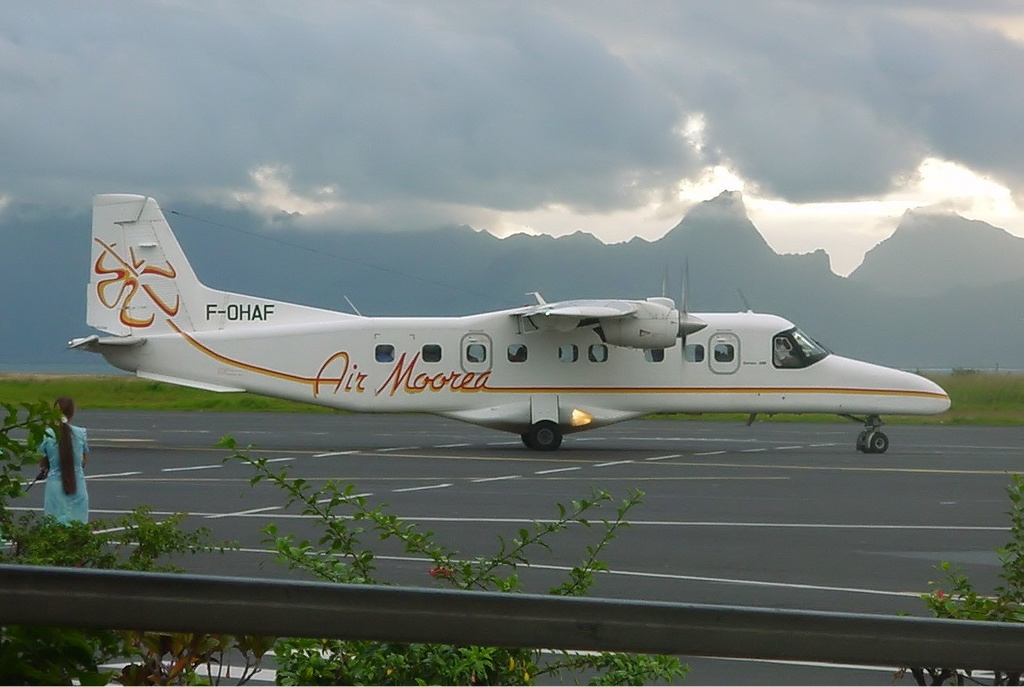
- An Air Moorea Dornier 228, similar to the aircraft involved in the accident

Accident
- Date: 18 April 1991
- Summary: Ditched following engine failure and loss of altitude
- Site: near Nuku Hiva Airport, French Polynesia; 8°47′18.5″S 140°14′25.4″W

Aircraft
- Aircraft type: Dornier 228-212
- Operator: Air Tahiti
- Registration: F-OHAB
- Flight origin: Hiva Oa Airport
- Destination: Nuku Hiva Airport
- Occupants: 22
- Passengers: 20
- Crew: 2
- Fatalities: 10
- Injuries: 12
- Survivors: 12

On 18 April 1991, Air Tahiti Flight 805, a Dornier 228-212 flying a scheduled domestic passenger flight from Hiva Oa to Nuku Hiva in French Polynesia, crashed following a ditching attempt whilst on approach to Nuku Hiva Airport, killing 10 of the 22 occupants on board.

== Aircraft ==
The aircraft involved was a Dornier 228-212 registered as F-OHAB with serial number 8196. It was powered by two Garrett TPE331 engines. The aircraft was delivered to Air Tahiti on 8 October 1990. At the time of the accident, the aircraft had accumulated a total of 634 flight hours.

== Passengers and crew ==
The aircraft carried 20 passengers and a two crew members. The captain was 38 years old, he joined Air Tahiti in 1979, he had a total 8115 flight hours of which 112 on the Dornier 228. The first officer was 42 years old, he joined the airline in 1987 and had a total 4766 flight hours of which 95 on the Dornier 228. On board there were 20 passengers, of which one was a child.

== Flight history ==
The Dornier Do 228 departed from Hiva Oa at 11:10 a.m. local time (10:40 p.m. CET) with 22 individuals on board. At 11:43 a.m. local time (11:13 p.m. CET), the crew contacted air traffic control in Nuku Hiva, which instructed them to land on runway 06. However, at 11:56 a.m. local time (11:26 p.m. CET), air traffic control overheard one of the pilots stating an intention to approach runway 24. This was denied, and the crew was reiterated to land on runway 06. At this point, the aircraft was approximately 700 feet in altitude and 400 meters from runway 24, with both propellers having failed. The aircraft then made left and right turns before crashing into the water behind the runway.

== Investigation ==
The investigation concluded that the crash resulted from the pilots' inappropriate response to the engine failure. This alone should not have caused the crash. Additional contributing factors included probable crew intoxication, inadequate enforcement of type qualifications for the Dornier Do 228, and deficiencies in Air Tahiti's technical oversight of the aircraft. The Directorate General for Civil Aviation (DGAC) had failed to correctly supervise the pilot qualification program on the aircraft which had been rushed into service. The DGAC was also faulted for not having noticed the hastiness of its entry into service or the airline's lack of rigor in crew training.
