= Niau Airport =

Airport in French Polynesia

- IATA: NIU; ICAO: NTKN

Summary
- Serves: Niau, French Polynesia
- Coordinates: 16°07′10″S 146°22′11″W

Map
- Location in French Polynesia

Niau Airport (IATA: NIU, ICAO: NTKN) is an airport on Niau atoll in French Polynesia. The airport received 2300 passengers in 2021.

The construction of the airport resulted in significant disruption to the habitat of the endangered Niau kingfisher.

== Airlines and destinations ==
Air Tahiti connects Niau Airport to Arutua Airport and Faaʼa International Airport (Papeete).

== See also ==
- List of airports in French Polynesia
