= Air Moana =

French airline based in French Polynesia

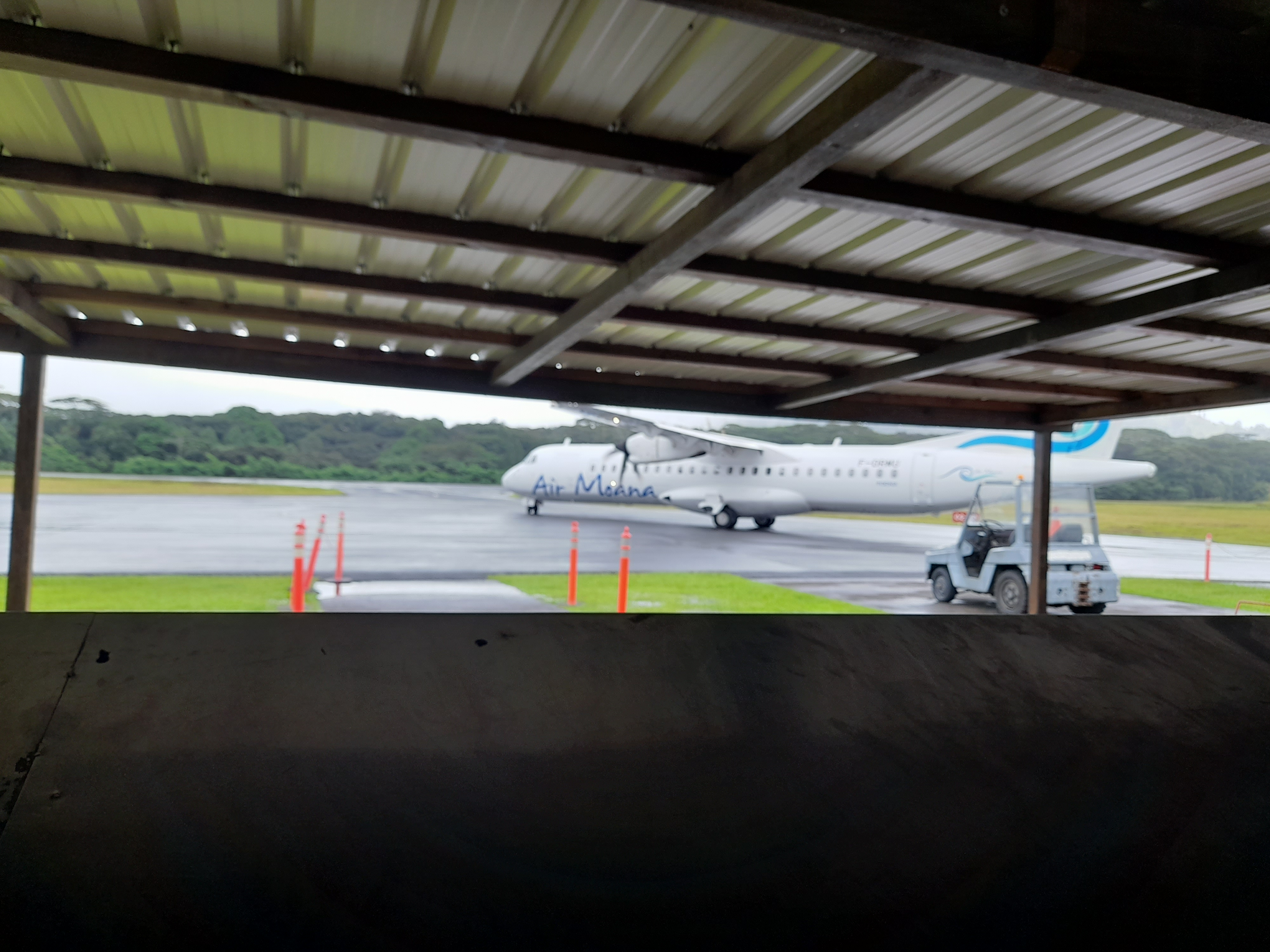
- An Air Moana ATR 72-600 at Atuona Airport in 2023
| IATA | ICAO | Call sign |
|---|---|---|
| NM | NTR | NATIREVA |
- Founded: 2022
- Commenced operations: 13 February 2023
- Hubs: Faa'a International Airport
- Fleet size: 4 (September 2026)
- Destinations: 9, including Tahiti (November 2026)
- Headquarters: Papeete, French Polynesia, France
- Key people: Olivier-Jean Bréaud (president of Natireva)
- Founder: Christian Vernaudon
- Employees: More than 300 (2026)
- Website: www.airmoana.com

Air Moana is a French regional airline based in French Polynesia. It is the trading name of Natireva, a company headquartered in Papeete. The airline operates domestic services from Faa'a International Airport on Tahiti, using ATR 72-600 aircraft. Commercial flights began on 13 February 2023.

== History ==
=== Establishment and launch ===
The airline project was developed by Natireva, a company founded by Christian Vernaudon, a former head of Air Tahiti. In December 2021, the French Polynesian Council of Ministers approved an air carrier licence for Natireva to operate inter-island passenger and freight services. By January 2022, Natireva was recruiting pilots and initially hoped to start flights in April that year.

On 7 December 2022, the Council of Ministers approved the airline's operating licence. Sofidep, the territory's development finance company, took a stake in Air Moana that month. The airline received its first ATR 72-600, named Poeiti, in Tahiti on 19 December 2022. It then employed 177 people.

By early February 2023, Air Moana had obtained its air operator's certificate. Its initial schedule covered Bora Bora, Raiatea and Rangiroa. The airline flew two inaugural services to Bora Bora for invited guests on 8 February, ahead of the start of commercial services on 13 February.

A second ATR 72-600, named Poenui, arrived in Tahiti on 9 March 2023. The airline announced that the aircraft would allow it to increase its schedule and begin serving Nuku Hiva and Hiva Oa in the Marquesas Islands.

=== Expansion ===
Air Moana received its third ATR 72-600 on 27 June 2025. The new aircraft, registered F-OORA and named Poehere, entered commercial service between Tahiti and Raiatea on 1 July. Services to Huahine began on 3 July, followed by Fakarava on 4 July.

A leased ATR 72-600, F-OREV, joined the fleet in April 2026 under the name Poereva. Another new aircraft, F-OPOE, arrived in Tahiti on 21 September 2026. It was named Poenui, reusing the name of the airline's second aircraft.

== Corporate affairs ==
Air Moana is operated by Natireva, a simplified joint-stock company. As of 2026, Olivier-Jean Bréaud was its president. Lionel Guérin became Air Moana's chairman and chief executive in December 2024, and later became chair of its supervisory board.

=== Financing ===
In October 2024, following financial difficulties that threatened the continuation of flights, Air Moana announced that private investors had committed three billion CFP francs to an increase in its capital.

On 27 January 2026, following a challenge by Air Tahiti, the Administrative Court of French Polynesia annulled government decisions granting Natireva a CFP 600 million loan and two loan guarantees capped at approximately CFP 537 million and CFP 400 million. The court found that the company's equity position did not meet the conditions for the loan and guarantees. It separately rejected Air Tahiti's challenge to the government's acquisition of a stake in Natireva. In July 2026, the Paris Administrative Court of Appeal refused Natireva's applications to stay the annulment judgments.

In late 2026, Natireva opened an equity crowdfunding offer through Fenua Financement. The offer sought up to €5 million in several tranches to fund aircraft and working capital.

=== Operating figures ===
The financial figures below refer to Natireva and were published in Fenua Financement's investment documentation.

Operating and financial figures for 2025
| Measure | Figure |
|---|---|
| Passengers carried | Approximately 157,000 |
| Flights recorded by the air navigation service | Approximately 5,300 |
| Natireva revenue | CFP 1.825 billion |
| Natireva net result | CFP 1.502 billion loss |

French Polynesia's civil aviation service (SEAC) ranked Air Moana second to Air Tahiti by controlled flight movements in the territory's airspace in 2025. It recorded about 1,000 more Air Moana flights than in 2024. In the first half of 2026, the airline reported passenger growth of 27% and revenue growth of 38% compared with the same period in 2025.

== Destinations ==
As of November 2026, Air Moana served nine airports in French Polynesia, including its Tahiti base. The other eight destinations were in the Society Islands, Tuamotus and Marquesas Islands.

| Island group | Island or atoll | Airport | IATA code |
|---|---|---|---|
| Society Islands | Tahiti | Faa'a International Airport (hub) | PPT |
| Society Islands | Moorea | Moorea Airport | MOZ |
| Society Islands | Raiatea | Raiatea Airport | RFP |
| Society Islands | Huahine | Huahine - Fare Airport | HUH |
| Society Islands | Bora Bora | Bora Bora Airport | BOB |
| Tuamotus | Rangiroa | Rangiroa Airport | RGI |
| Tuamotus | Fakarava | Fakarava Airport | FAV |
| Marquesas Islands | Nuku Hiva | Nuku Hiva Airport | NHV |
| Marquesas Islands | Hiva Oa | Atuona Airport | AUQ |

The airline announced plans to serve Tikehau from April 2027. This planned destination is not included in the total above.

== Fleet ==
Following the arrival of the latest aircraft in September 2026, Air Moana's operating fleet consisted of four ATR 72-600 aircraft.

Operating fleet as of September 2026
| Aircraft type | In service |
|---|---|
| ATR 72-600 | 4 |

New aircraft in the fleet renewal programme are equipped with Pratt & Whitney Canada PW127XT engines.

In November 2026, Natireva's financing documentation stated that one aircraft was being returned to its lessor, followed by another that month, while a further new aircraft, was expected in December 2026. One aircraft remained on lease from Azorra.

== See also ==
- List of airlines of French Polynesia
- List of airports in French Polynesia
