= List of airlines of French Polynesia =

This is a list of airlines operating in French Polynesia.

== Active ==
Airline	Image	IATA	ICAO	Callsign	Founded	Notes
Air Archipels			RHL	ARCHIPELS	1996	
Air Moana		NM	NTR	NATIREVA	2022	
Air Tahiti		VT	VTA	AIR TAHITI	1950	
Air Tahiti Nui		TN	THT	TAHITI	1996	Flag carrier.
Air Tetiaroa			TOA		2013	
Wan Air		3W	VNR	WAN AIR	1987	

== Defunct ==
Airline	Image	IATA	ICAO	Callsign	Founded	Ceased operations	Notes
Air Moorea		QE	TAH	AIR MOOREA	1968	2010	
Tahiti Conquest Airlines			TCA	MANUREVA	1990	1996	

== See also ==
- List of defunct airlines of French Polynesia
- List of airlines
