= Raivavae Airport =

Airport in French Polynesia

- IATA: RVV; ICAO: NTAV

Summary
- Airport type: Public
- Operator: DSEAC Polynésie française
- Serves: Raivavae, Austral Islands, French Polynesia
- Elevation AMSL: 5 m (16 ft)
- Coordinates: 23°53′10″S 147°39′55″W

Map
- Location of the airport in French Polynesia

Runways
Direction	Length		Surface
Direction	m	ft	Surface
06/24	1,400	4,593	Asphalt
- Sources: AIP, GCM, STV

Raivavae Airport (IATA: RVV, ICAO: NTAV) is an airport on Raivavae, part of the Austral Islands in French Polynesia. The airport is adjacent to the village of Rairua.

== Airlines and destinations ==
Air Tahiti connects Raivavae Airport to Faaʼa International Airport (Papeete), Rurutu Airport, and Tubuai Mataura Airport.

== See also ==
- List of airports in French Polynesia
