= XMH =

XMH or xmh may refer to:

- XMH, the IATA code for Manihi Airport, French Polynesia
- xmh, the ISO 639-3 code for Kuku-Muminh language, Queensland, Australia
