= FHZ =

FHZ can refer to:

- Femtohertz, an SI unit for frequency equivalent to one quintillionth of a hertz
- Fakahina Airfield, an airfield in Fakahina atoll, French Polynesia, by IATA code
- $F_{HZ}$, the fraction of stars with rocky planets in the habitable zone, in Seager's variant of the Drake equation; see Drake equation#Modifications
