= Fakarava Airport =

Fakarava Airport Aérodrome de Fakarava
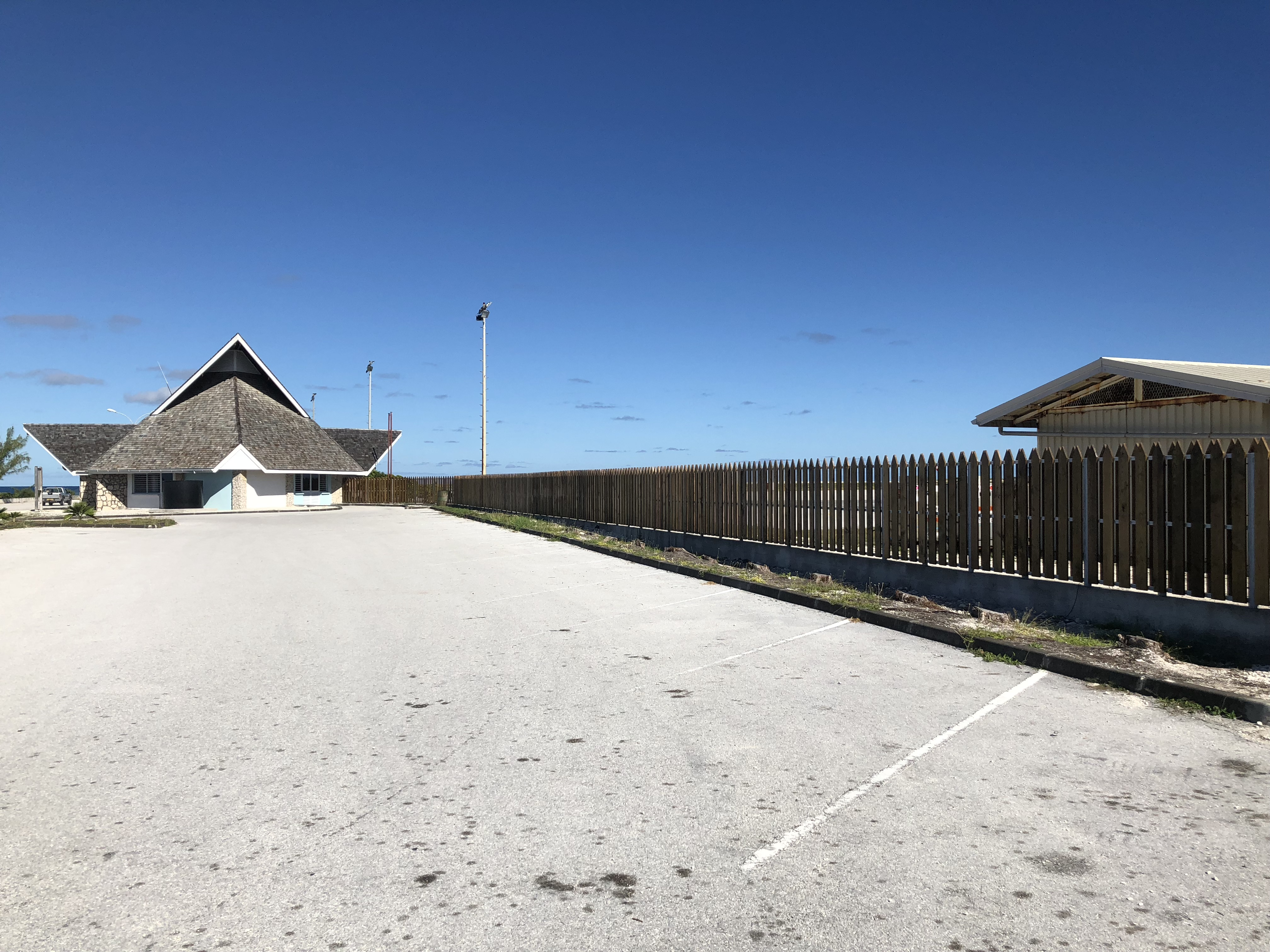
- IATA: FAV; ICAO: NTGF

Summary
- Airport type: Public
- Operator: DSEAC Polynésie Française
- Serves: Fakarava
- Location: Fakarava, Tuamotu, French Polynesia
- Elevation AMSL: 13 ft / 4 m
- Coordinates: 16°03′15″S 145°39′25″W

Map
- Location of the airport in French Polynesia

Runways
Direction	Length		Surface
Direction	m	ft	Surface
05/23	1,400	4,593	Paved

Statistics (2011)
- Aircraft Movements: n/a
- Passengers: 2,477
- Source: French AIP.

Fakarava Airport is an airport serving the island of Fakarava in French Polynesia (IATA: FAV, ICAO: NTGF). The airport is 3.5 km west of the village of Rotoava. It is located northeast of Papeete, the Tahitian Capital.

== Airlines and destinations ==
Airlines	Destinations
Air Moana	Papeete
Air Tahiti	Kauehi, Papeete, Rangiroa

== See also ==
- List of airports in French Polynesia
