= Air France Flight 072 =

Air France Flight 072 may refer to:

- Air France Flight 072 (1948), a flight that went missing over the Atlantic Ocean
- Air France Flight 072 (1993), a flight was involved in an accident at Faaʼa International Airport
