= Rangiroa Airport =

Airport in Rangiroa, French Polynesia

Rangiroa Airport Aéroport de Rangiroa
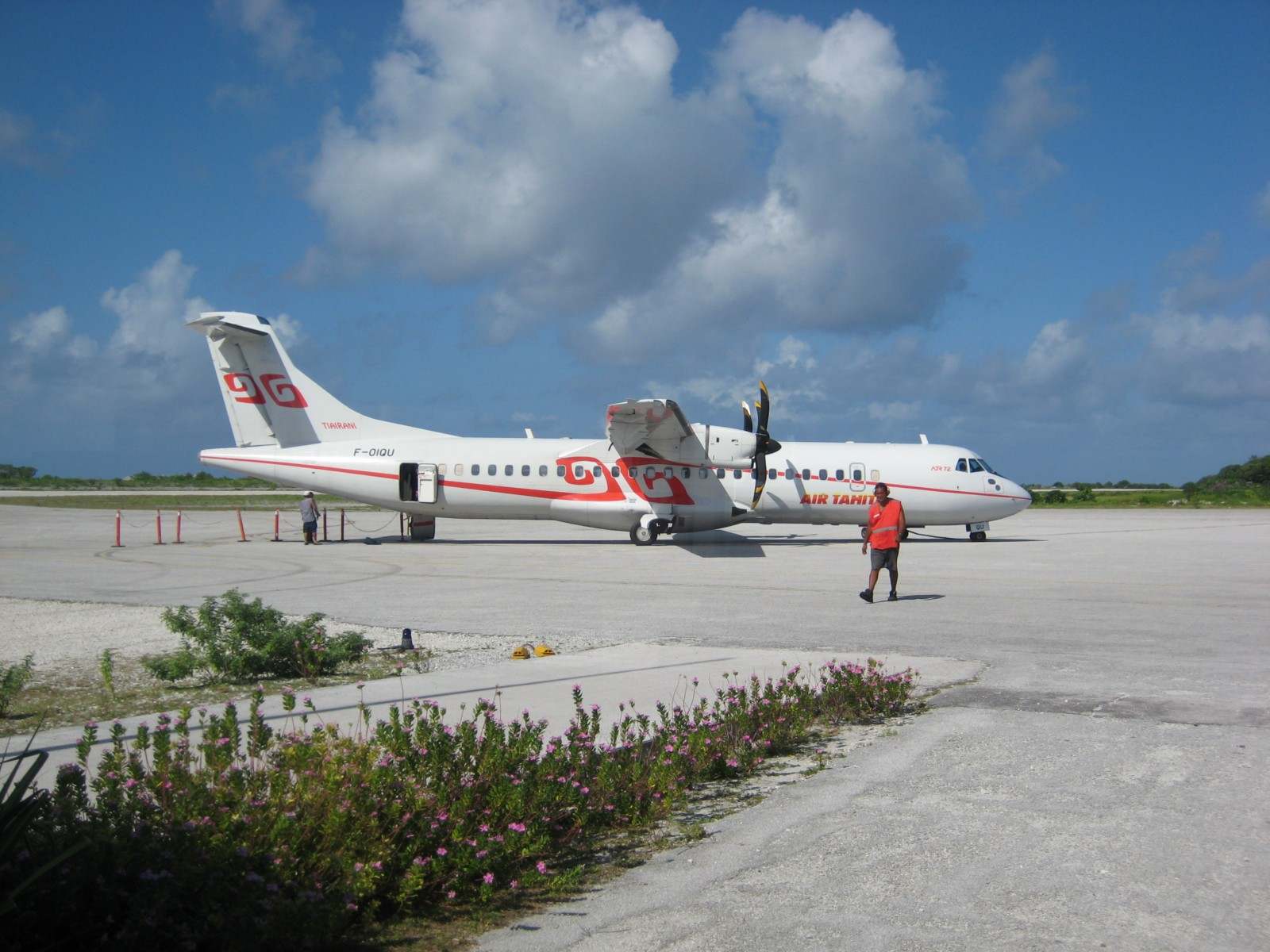
- IATA: RGI; ICAO: NTTG

Summary
- Airport type: Public
- Operator: S.E.T.I.L. Aéroports
- Location: Rangiroa
- Elevation AMSL: 3.66 m / 12 ft
- Coordinates: 14°57′23.04″S 147°39′32.76″W

Map
- Location of the airport in French Polynesia

Runways
Direction	Length		Surface
Direction	m	ft	Surface
09/27	2,100	6,890	Asphalt

Rangiroa Airport is an airport on the island of Rangiroa, French Polynesia (IATA: RGI, ICAO: NTTG). The airport is located on the northwestern edge of the atoll, 5.5 km southeast of Avatoru. The airport was built in 1965. Air Tahiti has regular daily flights connecting Rangiroa to other islands of French Polynesia. In 2018, 89,122 passengers utilized the airport.

== Airlines and destinations ==
=== Passenger ===
Airlines	Destinations
Air Moana	Fakarava, Papeete
Air Tahiti	Bora Bora, Fakarava, Manihi, Mataiva, Papeete, Tikehau

== Accidents and incidents ==
On February 19, 1985, a UTA DC-10 operating from Los Angeles to Auckland via Tahiti made an emergency landing at Rangiroa following a telephoned bomb threat. Passengers and luggage were removed and flown to Tahiti onboard French military aircraft. The aircraft was searched and no bomb was found. The aircraft was flown empty to Tahiti a week later.

== See also ==
- List of airports in French Polynesia
