= Tikehau Airport =

Airport in Tikehau, French Polynesia

Tikehau Airport Aéroport de Tikehau
- IATA: TIH; ICAO: NTGC

Summary
- Airport type: Public
- Operator: SEAC Polynésie Française
- Location: Tikehau
- Elevation AMSL: 6 ft (1.8 m)
- Coordinates: 15°07′10.92″S 148°14′0.96″W

Map
- Location of the airport in French Polynesia

Runways
Direction	Length		Surface
Direction	m	ft	Surface
06/24	1,200	3,937	Paved

Tikehau Airport is an airport on Tikehau atoll in French Polynesia (IATA: TIH, ICAO: NTGC). The airport is located 1 km southeast of Tuherahera. It was inaugurated in 1977. In 2009, 41,817 passengers transited through Tikehau.

The airport has minimal services: there is no runway lighting system for landing at night, no instrument approach and no control tower.

== Airlines and destinations ==
Air Tahiti connects Tikehau Airport to Faaʼa International Airport (Papeete), Bora Bora Airport, Manihi Airport, Raiatea Airport, and Rangiroa Airport.

== See also ==
- List of airports in French Polynesia
