= Totegegie Airport =

Airport in Totegegie, French Polynesia

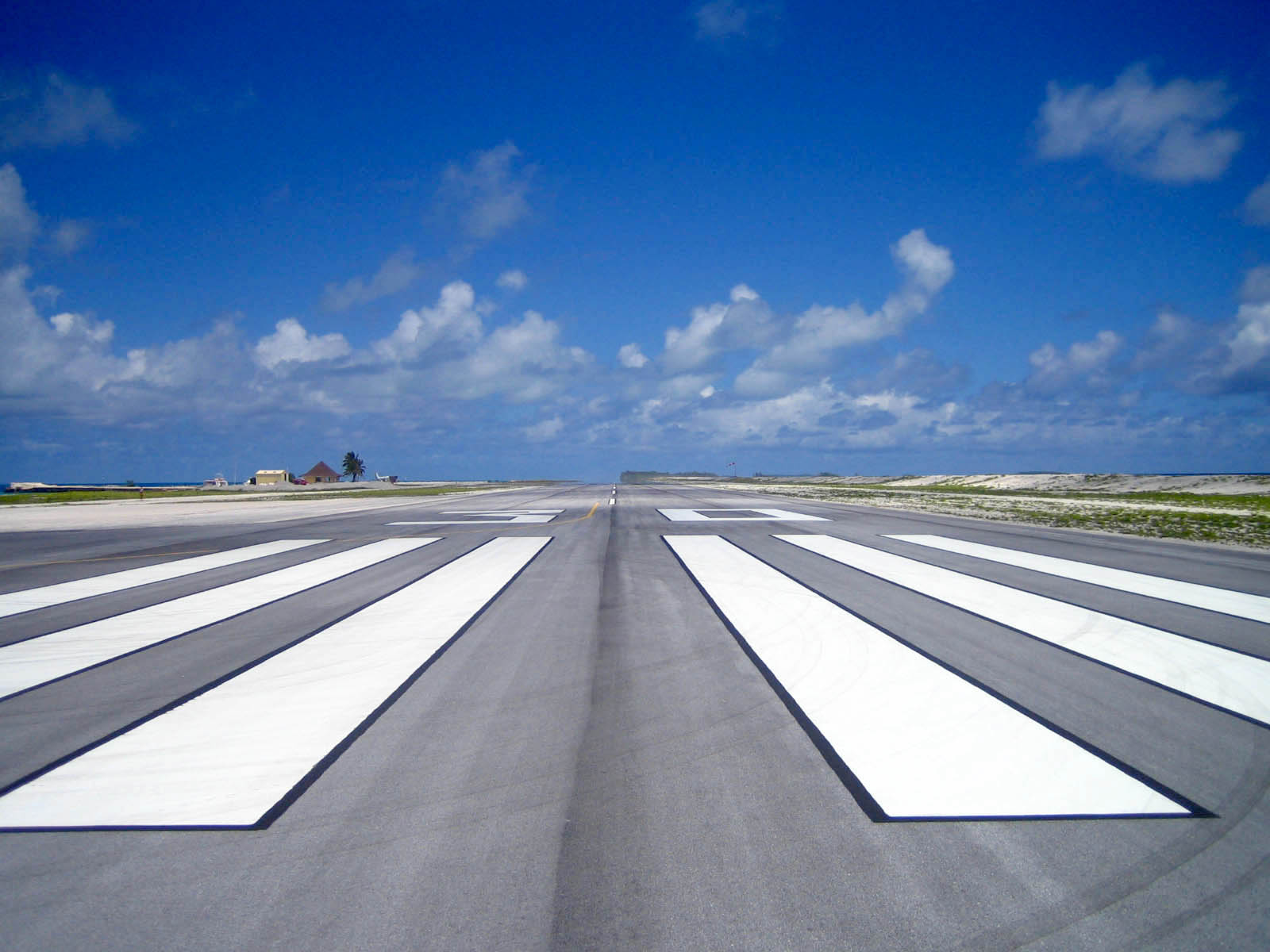
- IATA: GMR; ICAO: NTGJ

Summary
- Airport type: Public
- Serves: Gambier Islands, French Polynesia; Is the closest airport to the Pitcairn Islands
- Location: Rikitea
- Elevation AMSL: 7 ft (2.1 m)
- Coordinates: 23°05′04″S 134°53′07″W

Map
- Location of the airport in French Polynesia

Runways
Direction	Length		Surface
Direction	m	ft	Surface
12/30	2,000	6,562	Asphalt
- Sources: French AIP

Totegegie Airport (IATA: GMR, ICAO: NTGJ) is an airport on Totegegie Island in the Gambier Islands, French Polynesia. It is 9 km northeast of the village of Rikitea.

Totegegie is one of Mangareva island's reefs, approximately 9 km (5.6 mi) from Rikitea, the island's administrative settlement. It has the only building on the reef. The airport is 1,652 km (1,027 mi) from Tahiti and is classified as a territorial aerodrome. Its only commercial service is to Tahiti's Fa'a'ā International Airport on Tuesdays.

Totegegie Airport is crucial in its role as the outside world's link to Pitcairn Island. One of the few ways a traveler can reach Pitcairn is to fly to Tahiti, then to Totegegie. From there, a 32-hour boat ride will take one to Pitcairn.

== History ==
The 3,500 metres (11,500 ft) runway was constructed in 1967 by the 115th running of the Society of the Pacific Experimentation Centre Pacific (CEP). The first aircraft, a Piper Aztec, landed in 1968. The same year, a DC-6 performed weekly service between Totegegie, Mururoa and Papeete. In 1978, the first commercial air link was established between Totegegie and Papeete.

The French army buildings were decommissioned in 1998. At the end of operations 50 tons of scrap metal had been collected.

In 2008, the terminal was expanded and modernized.

== Airlines and destinations ==
Air Tahiti connects Totegegie Airport to Hao Airport and Faaʼa International Airport (Papeete).

== Ground transportation ==
The airport is connected to Mangareva and its city Rikitea by boat.

From Mangareva there are boats going to Pitcairn Island, the main way of getting there.

== Passengers ==
The annual number of passengers is shown below.
Years	1998	1999	2000	2001	2002	2003	2004	2005	2006	2007	2008	2009	2010	2011	2012	2013	2014	2015	2016	2017	2018	2019	2020
Passengers	5,236	5,249	5,319	5,129	4,937	5,609	5,922	6,598	6,938	7,155	7,409	6,850	7,420	7,003	7,798	7,521	7,498	7,201	7,675	8,498	9,053	9,653	4,501

== See also ==
- List of airports in French Polynesia
