= Mataiva Airport =

Airport on Mataiva, French Polynesia

- IATA: MVT; ICAO: NTGV

Summary
- Serves: Mataiva
- Elevation AMSL: 11 ft (3.4 m)
- Coordinates: 14°52′12″S 148°42′40.32″W

Map
- Location of the airport in French Polynesia

Runways
Direction	Length		Surface
Direction	ft	m	Surface
01/19	3,937	1,200	Asphalt

Mataiva Airport is an airport on Mataiva in French Polynesia (IATA: MVT, ICAO: NTGV). It is west of Pahua village. It was constructed in 1999. It received just over 10000 passengers in 2021.

== Airlines and destinations ==
Air Tahiti connects Mataiva Airport to Faaʼa International Airport (Papeete) and Rangiroa Airport.

== See also ==
- List of airports in French Polynesia
