= Hikueru Airport =

Airport on the atoll of Hikueru, French Polynesia

- IATA: HHZ; ICAO: NTGH

Summary
- Airport type: Public
- Operator: DSEAC Polynésie française
- Serves: Tupapati, Hikueru, Tuamotus, French Polynesia
- Elevation AMSL: 5 m (16 ft)
- Coordinates: 17°32′52″S 142°36′46″W

Map
- Location of the airport in French Polynesia

Runways
Direction	Length		Surface
Direction	m	ft	Surface
10/28	1,200	3,937	Bitumen
- Sources: AIP, GCM, STV

Hikueru Airport (IATA: HHZ, ICAO: NTGH) is an airport on the atoll of Hikueru, part of the Tuamotu Archipelago in French Polynesia. The airport is adjacent to the village of Tupapati.

== Airlines and destinations ==
Air Tahiti connects Hikueru Airport to Hao Airport and Faaʼa International Airport (Papeete).

== See also ==
- List of airports in French Polynesia
