= Tatakoto Airport =

Airport in French Polynesia

Tatakoto Airport Aérodrome de Tatakoto
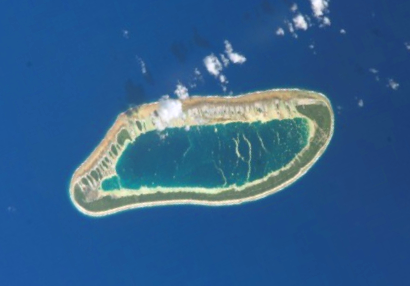
- NASA satellite image of Tatakoto
- IATA: TKV; ICAO: NTGO

Summary
- Airport type: Public
- Operator: DSEAC Polynésie Française
- Serves: Tatakoto, Tuamotu, French Polynesia
- Elevation AMSL: 3 m (9.8 ft)
- Coordinates: 17°21′19″S 138°26′42″W

Map
- Location of the airport in French Polynesia

Runways
Direction	Length		Surface
Direction	m	ft	Surface
07L/25R	1,200	3,937	Paved
- Source: French AIP.

Tatakoto Airport (IATA: TKV, ICAO: NTGO) is an airport serving the village of Tumukuru, located on the island of Tatakoto, in the Tuamotu group of atolls in French Polynesia, 1,180 kilometres (730 mi) from Tahiti.

Tatakoto Airport was inaugurated in 1979.

== Airlines and destinations ==
Air Tahiti connects Tatakoto Airport to Faaʼa International Airport (Papeete).

== See also ==
- List of airports in French Polynesia
