= Kauehi Aerodrome =

Airport in French Polynesia

Kauehi Aerodrome Aérodrome de Kauehi
- IATA: KHZ; ICAO: NTKA

Summary
- Airport type: Public
- Operator: DSEAC Polynésie française
- Serves: Kauehi, Tuamotu, French Polynesia
- Coordinates: 14°25′41″S 146°15′25″W

Map
- Location of the airport in French Polynesia

Runways
Direction	Length		Surface
Direction	ft	m	Surface
06/24
- Sources: AIP, GCM, STV

Kauehi Aerodrome (IATA: KHZ, ICAO: NTKA) is an airport on Kauehi, part of the Tuamotu in French Polynesia.

== Airlines and destinations ==
Air Tahiti connects Kauehi Aerodrome to Faaʼa International Airport (Papeete).

== See also ==
- List of airports in French Polynesia
