= Wan Air =

IATA	ICAO	Call sign
3W	VNR	WAN AIR
- Founded: 1987
- Hubs: Faʻaʻā, Tahiti, France
- Fleet size: 2
- Website: http://www.wanair.pf/

Wan Air is a French airline based at Faʻaʻā, Tahiti, French Polynesia, France. It now operates privately for the pearl industry and has ceased public transport operations.

== History ==
The airline was established and started operations in 1987. It operated mainly passenger charter services, but also operated some scheduled services to nearby islands - Bora Bora, Huahine and Raiatea, as well as to outer islands including the Marquesas Islands, Austral Islands and Tuamotus. On 28 November 2004, Wan Air stopped public transport operations and now operates privately for the pearl industry.

== Fleet ==
As of August 2006, the Wan Air fleet includes:

Wan Air fleet
Aircraft	Total	Orders	Passengers
Raytheon Beech 1900D Airliner	1	0	19
Dornier 328Jet	1	0	31
