= Ahe Airport =

Airport in Ahe, Tuamotu, French Polynesia

Ahe Airport Aérodrome d'Ahe
- IATA: AHE; ICAO: NTHE

Summary
- Airport type: Public
- Operator: DSEAC Polynésie Française
- Location: Ahe, Tuamotu, French Polynesia
- Elevation AMSL: 3 m (9.8 ft)
- Coordinates: 14°25′41″S 146°15′25″W

Map
- Location of the airport in French Polynesia

Runways
Direction	Length		Surface
Direction	m	ft	Surface
06/24	1,240	4,068	Paved
- Source: French AIP.

Ahe Airport (IATA: AHE, ICAO: NTHE) is an airport on Ahe (Tenukupara), an atoll in French Polynesia.

== Airlines and destinations ==
Air Tahiti connects Ahe Airport to Arutua Airport, Manihi Airport, and Faaʼa International Airport (Papeete).

== See also ==
- List of airports in French Polynesia
