= Ua Pou Airport =

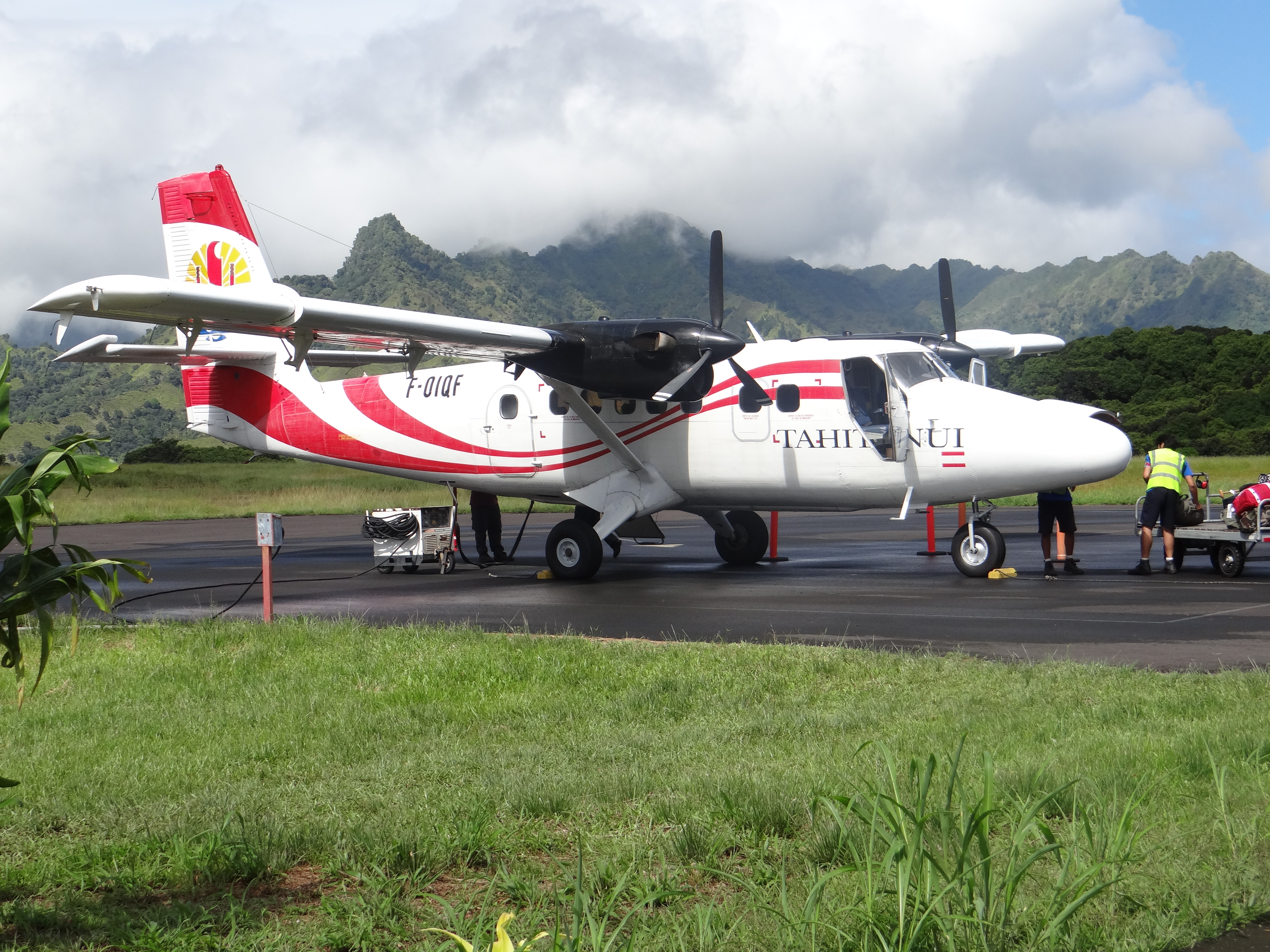
- IATA: UAP; ICAO: NTMP

Summary
- Airport type: Public
- Serves: Hakahau, Ua Pou
- Location: Marquesas Islands, French Polynesia
- Elevation AMSL: 16 ft (4.9 m)
- Coordinates: 09°21′06″S 140°04′40″W

Map
- Location of the airport in French Polynesia

Runways
Direction	Length		Surface
Direction	m	ft	Surface
14/33	830	2,723	Paved
- Sources: Great Circle Mapper

Ua Pou Airport is an airport on Ua Pou in French Polynesia (IATA: UAP, ICAO: NTMP). The airport is 11 km northwest of the village of Hakahau. As of 2021 it received 3900 passengers a year.

The runway is short, narrow, and slopes uphill, making Ua Pou an Altiport. Aircraft can only land when arriving from the sea, and can only take off towards the sea, whatever the prevailing wind. The runway is 846m long, with a 30m drop.

== Airlines and destinations ==
Air Tahiti connects Ua Pou Airport to Atuona Airport, Nuku Hiva Airport, and Ua Huka Airport.

== See also ==
- List of airports in French Polynesia
