= Rimatara Airport =

Airport in French Polynesia

- IATA: RMT; ICAO: NTAM

Summary
- Airport type: Public
- Serves: Rimatara, Austral Islands, French Polynesia
- Elevation AMSL: 5 m (16 ft)
- Coordinates: 22°38′13″S 152°48′21″W

Map
- Location of the airport in French Polynesia

Runways
Direction	Length		Surface
Direction	m	ft	Surface
07/25	1,400	4,593	Asphalt

Rimatara Airport is an airport on Rimatara in French Polynesia (IATA: RMT, ICAO: NTAM). The airport was built in 2006.

The airport was renovated in 2018.

== Airlines and destinations ==
Air Tahiti connects Rimatara Airport to Faaʼa International Airport (Papeete) and Rurutu Airport.

== See also ==
- List of airports in French Polynesia
