= Ua Huka Airport =

Airport in Ua Huka, Marquesas Islands, French Polynesia

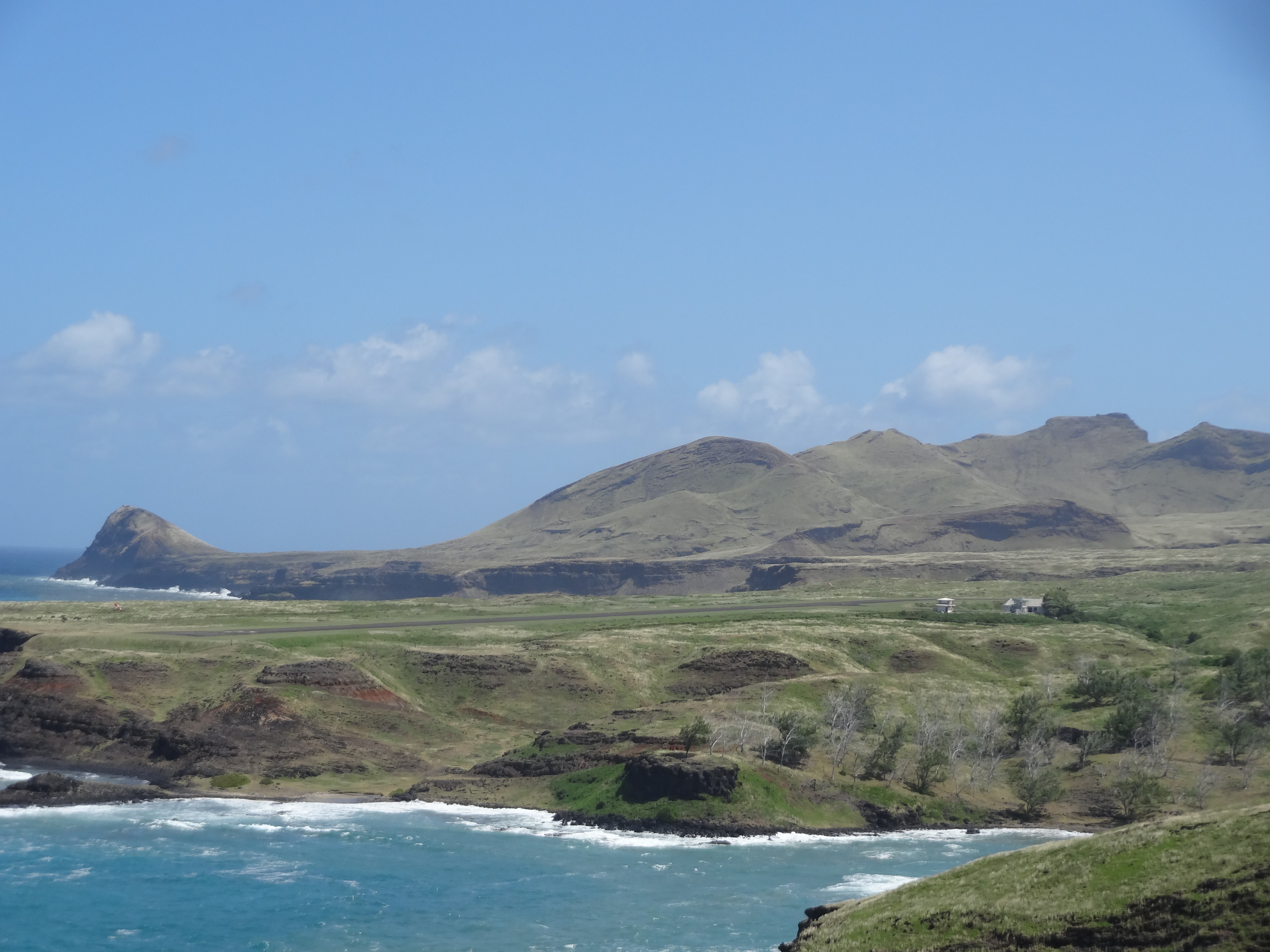
- IATA: UAH; ICAO: NTMU

Summary
- Airport type: Public
- Serves: Hane, Ua Huka
- Location: Marquesas Islands, French Polynesia
- Elevation AMSL: 160 ft (49 m)
- Coordinates: 08°56′06.7″S 139°33′18.4″W

Map
- Location of the airport in French Polynesia

Runways
Direction	Length		Surface
Direction	m	ft	Surface
09/27	755	2,477	Paved
- Sources: Great Circle Mapper

Ua Huka Airport is an airport on Ua Huka in French Polynesia (IATA: UAH, ICAO: NTMU). The airport is 2.2 km southwest of the village of Hane. The airport was opened on November 4, 1970, with the first landings made by an Air Tahiti Piper Aztec and an RAI Twin Otter. Commercial flights began in 1971. As of 2021 it received 1600 passengers a year.

== Airlines and destinations ==
Air Tahiti connects Ua Huka Airport to Atuona Airport, Nuku Hiva Airport, and Ua Pou Airport.

== See also ==
- List of airports in French Polynesia
