= Reao Airport =

Reao Airport Aérodrome de Reao
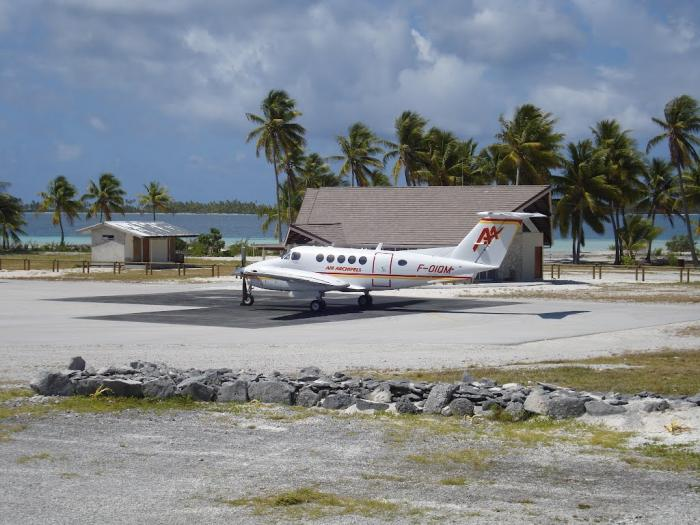
- IATA: REA; ICAO: NTGE

Summary
- Airport type: Public
- Operator: DSEAC Polynésie Française
- Serves: Reao
- Location: Reao, Tuamotu, French Polynesia
- Elevation AMSL: 12 ft / 4 m
- Coordinates: 18°27′48″S 136°26′35″W

Map
- Location of the airport in French Polynesia

Runways
Direction	Length		Surface
Direction	m	ft	Surface
11/29	917	3,008	Paved

Statistics (2011)
- Aircraft Movements: n/a
- Passengers: 2,477
- Source: French AIP.

Reao Airport (IATA: REA, ICAO: NTGE) is an airport serving the village of Tapuarava, located on the Reao island, in the Tuamotu group of atolls in French Polynesia.

Reao island airport was inaugurated in 1979.

== Airlines and destinations ==
=== Passenger ===
No scheduled flights as of May 2019.

== See also ==
- List of airports in French Polynesia
