= Raroia Airport =

Airport in French Polynesia

- IATA: RRR; ICAO: NTKO

Summary
- Airport type: Public
- Operator: DSEAC Polynésie française
- Serves: Garumaoa, Raroia, Tuamotus, French Polynesia
- Elevation AMSL: 5 m (16 ft)
- Coordinates: 16°02′49″S 142°28′37″W

Map
- Location of the airport in French Polynesia

Runways
Direction	Length		Surface
Direction	m	ft	Surface
16/34	1,180	3,871	Bitumen
- Sources: GCM, STV

Raroia Airport (IATA: RRR, ICAO: NTKO) is an airport on the atoll of Raroia, part of the Tuamotu Archipelago in French Polynesia. The airport is adjacent to the village of Garumaoa. It is not approved for night operations, and there are no hangars or repair facilities.

== Airlines and destinations ==
Air Tahiti connects Raroia Airport to Hao Airport, Hikueru Airport, and Faaʼa International Airport (Papeete).

== See also ==
- List of airports in French Polynesia
