= Atuona Airport =

Atuona Airport Hiva Oa Airport
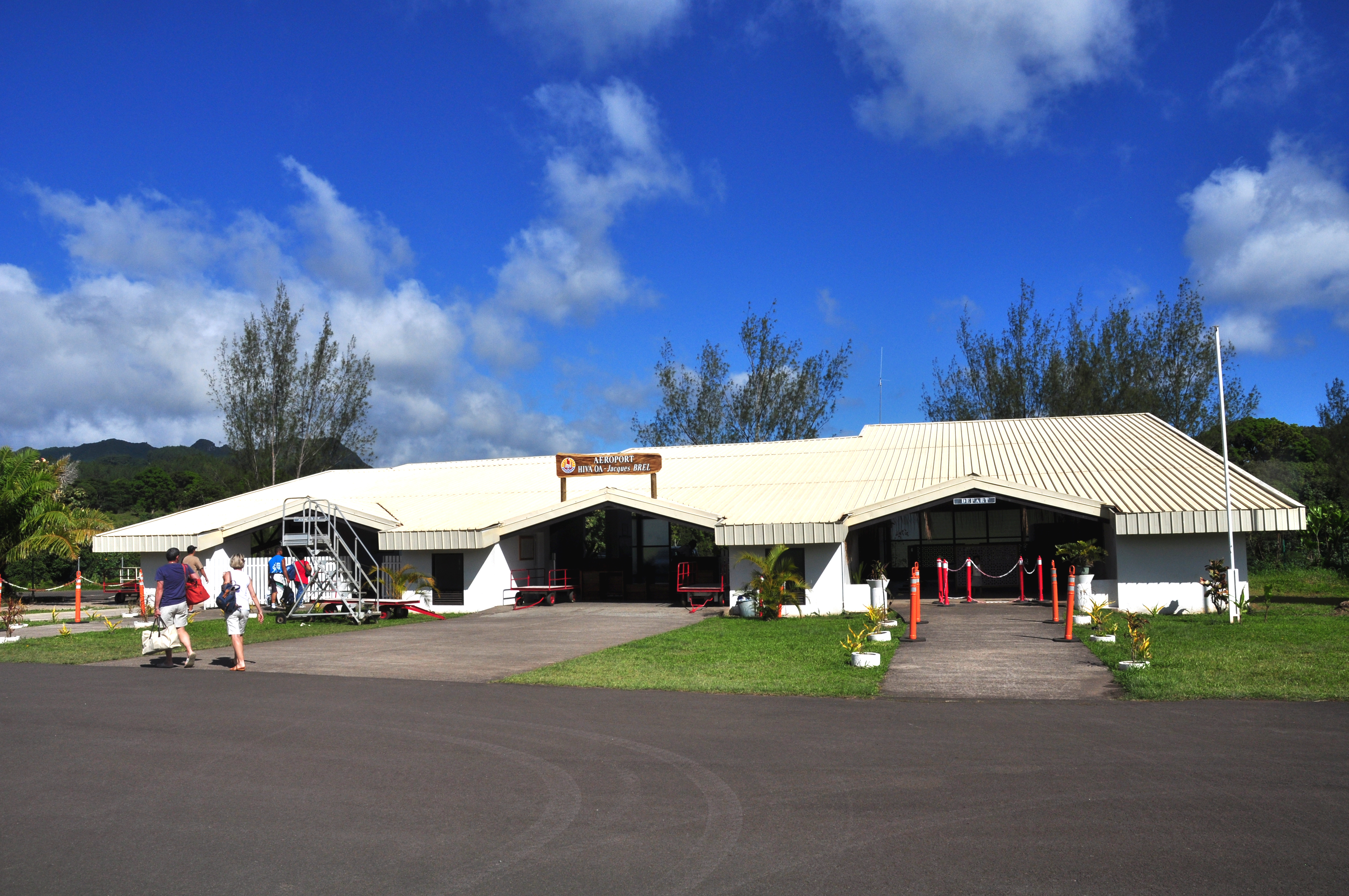
- IATA: AUQ; ICAO: NTMN

Summary
- Airport type: Public
- Serves: Atuona, Hiva Oa
- Location: Marquesas Islands, French Polynesia
- Elevation AMSL: 1,481 ft / 451 m
- Coordinates: 09°46′07″S 139°00′39.5″W

Map
- Location of the airport in French Polynesia

Runways
Direction	Length		Surface
Direction	m	ft	Surface
02/20	1,600	5,250	Paved

Atuona Airport or Hiva Oa Airport (IATA: AUQ, ICAO: NTMN) is an airport located 4.5 kilometres (2.8 mi) northeast of Atuona, on the island of Hiva Oa, in the Marquesas Islands of French Polynesia.

Previously, that airport had been assigned the HIX IATA location identifier, which has then been deprecated by IATA in 2012.

== Airlines and destinations ==
Airlines	Destinations
Air Moana	Nuku Hiva, Papeete
Air Tahiti	Nuku Hiva, Papeete, Ua Huka, Ua Pou

== See also ==
- List of airports in French Polynesia
