= Tureia Airport =

- IATA: ZTA; ICAO: NTGY

Summary
- Airport type: Public
- Serves: Hakamaru, Tureia
- Location: Tuamotu Archipelago, French Polynesia
- Elevation AMSL: 12 ft / 4 m
- Coordinates: 20°46′50.6″S 138°34′01.5″W
- Interactive map of Tureia Airport

Runways
Direction	Length		Surface
Direction	m	ft	Surface
n/a	1,050	3,445	Paved
- Sources: Great Circle Mapper

Tureia Airport is an airport on Tureia in French Polynesia (IATA: ZTA, ICAO: NTGY).

Tureia Airport was inaugurated in 1985.

== Airlines and destinations ==
=== Passenger ===
No scheduled flights as of May 2019.

== See also ==
- List of airports in French Polynesia
