= Vahitahi Airport =

Airport in French Polynesia

Vahitahi Airport Aérodrome de Vahitahi
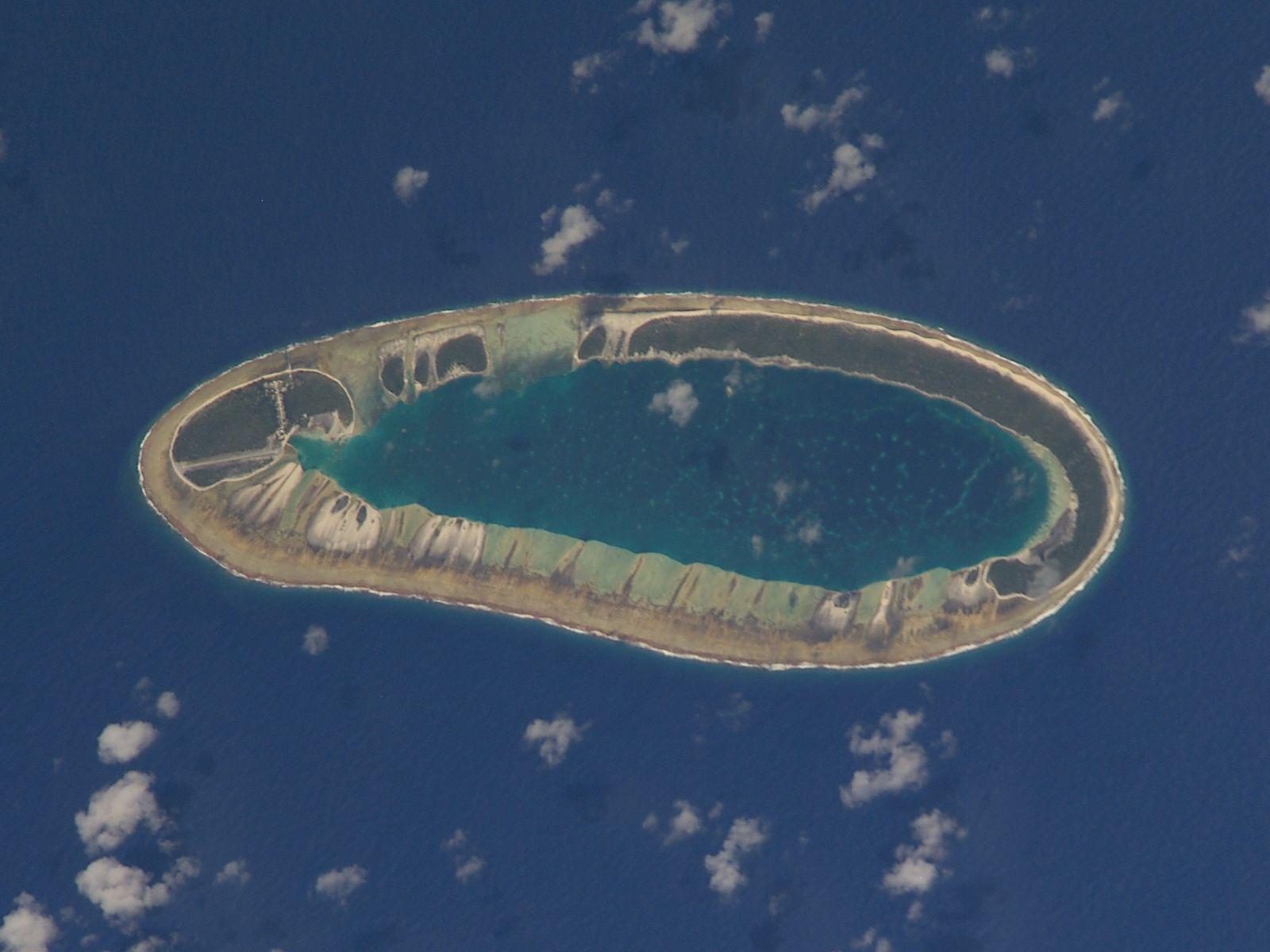
- NASA satellite image of Vahitahi
- IATA: VHZ; ICAO: NTUV

Summary
- Airport type: Public
- Operator: DSEAC Polynésie Française
- Serves: Vahitahi, Tuamotu, French Polynesia
- Elevation AMSL: 3 m / 10 ft
- Coordinates: 18°46′48″S 138°51′11″W

Map
- Location of the airport in French Polynesia

Runways
| Direction | Length | | Surface |
| Direction | m | ft | Surface |
|---|---|---|---|
| 06L/24R | 950 | 3,117 | Paved |
- Source: French AIP, GCM, STV

Vahitahi Airport (IATA: VHZ, ICAO: NTUV) is an airport that serves the village of Mohitu, located on the Vahitahi atoll, in the Tuamotu group of atolls in French Polynesia, 960 kilometres (600 mi) from Tahiti. The airport was inaugurated in 1978.

== See also ==
- List of airports in French Polynesia
