= Air France Flight 072 (1993) =

1993 aviation accident in French Polynesia

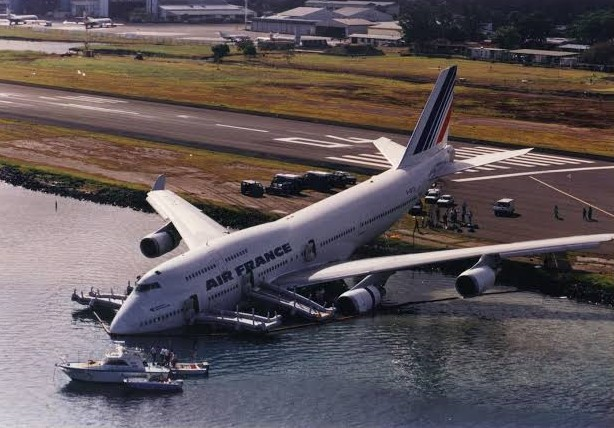
- The aircraft after the runway overrun

Accident
- Date: 12 September 1993
- Summary: Runway overrun on landing due to pilot error
- Site: Faaʼa International Airport, Tahiti, French Polynesia; Polynesia 17°33′47.2″S 149°37′15.9″W

Aircraft
- F-GITA, the aircraft involved in the accident, pictured in 2002
- Aircraft type: Boeing 747-428
- Operator: Air France
- IATA flight No.: AF072
- ICAO flight No.: AFR072
- Call sign: AIRFRANS 072
- Registration: F-GITA
- Flight origin: Charles de Gaulle Airport, Paris, France
- Stopover: Los Angeles International Airport, California, United States
- Destination: Faaʼa International Airport, Tahiti, French Polynesia
- Occupants: 272
- Passengers: 256
- Crew: 16
- Fatalities: 0
- Injuries: 4
- Survivors: 272

On 12 September 1993, Air France Flight 072, a Boeing 747-428 flying from Charles de Gaulle Airport, Paris, France, to Faaʼa International Airport, Tahiti, French Polynesia, with a stopover in Los Angeles International Airport, California, United States, overran the runway and ended up in a lagoon at its destination. All 272 people on board survived, but four injuries occurred. An investigation into the accident found out that the pilots did not notice that an autopilot mode was active during landing, this caused the engine number one thrust reverser to not activate, and eventually led to the overrun.

== Background ==
=== Aircraft ===
The aircraft involved in the accident was a Boeing 747-428 registered as F-GITA, and manufactured in 1991.

=== Occupants ===
The plane had a total of 272 occupants on board, 256 passengers and 16 crew members. The crew members were the two pilots and 14 flight attendants. The 59 years old captain had a total of 14082 flight hours, of which 4329 were on the Boeing 747; the first officer was 46 years old and had a total 13750 flight hours, of which 536 were on this aircraft type.

== Accident ==
The first leg of the flight, the Paris-Los Angeles one, went uneventful, and, at the end of the Los Angeles-Tahiti segment, the airplane prepared for landing at Faaʼa International Airport at around 9 pm local time. The aircraft landed fast and pretty far down runway 22, so the pilots activated the thrust reverser and brakes to decrease the plane's speed. Two seconds after the activation of the thrust reversers one of them, the one located on engine number one, instead of decreasing engine power started increasing it, until it reached 107% of the normal one. This disabled the spoilers and the autobrakes and cancelled the reverse thrust on engine number four. This thrust asymmetry made the pilots lose control of the aircraft, and eventually led the plane to overran the runway and end up in the lagoon present in front of the airport. Even with little control the pilots managed to veer rightwards at the last moment making the aircraft come to rest in a more shallow section of the lagoon, preventing so the 747 to sink in the deeper waters present directly in front of the runway. The aircraft was safely evacuated through slides, and everyone on board survived with only four injuries reported.

== Investigation ==
The french Bureau of Enquiry and Analysis for Civil Aviation Safety launched an investigation into the accident. The final report stated that during the approach the pilots did not notice that a go-around mode of the autopilot activated, so they left it there and the mode later, during touchdown, caused the activation of forward thrust in one of the engines. Also the unstable and long approach that was performed aggraveted the situation and caused the overran alongside the autopilot malfunction. The report also stated that it was deducted, through the cockpit voice recorder, that the communication between the two pilots were poor and made it difficult for them too coordinate on the actions to take and to adequately monitor instruments.

Recommendations were issued for airlines to train their pilots to follow more strictly approach procedures and to tell them to always go around when needed.

== Aftermath ==
Even though the Boeing 747-428 was heavily damaged, Air France decided to salvage and repair it nonetheless. A specialized team and tonnes of equipment, including specialised cranes and platforms, were sent to Tahiti to perform the operation, which was described as "unprecedented in the aviation sector". The aircraft was pulled out from the lagoon and underwent months of heavy repairs, until, in January of 1994, it was ferried back to France, where it returned to service. The aircraft was finally retired and later scrapped in 2010.

== See also ==
- Runway excursion
- China Airlines Flight 605, another 747 that went off the runway on landing, after an unstable approach, and ended up in water
