= Makemo Airport =

Airport on Makemo in French Polynesia

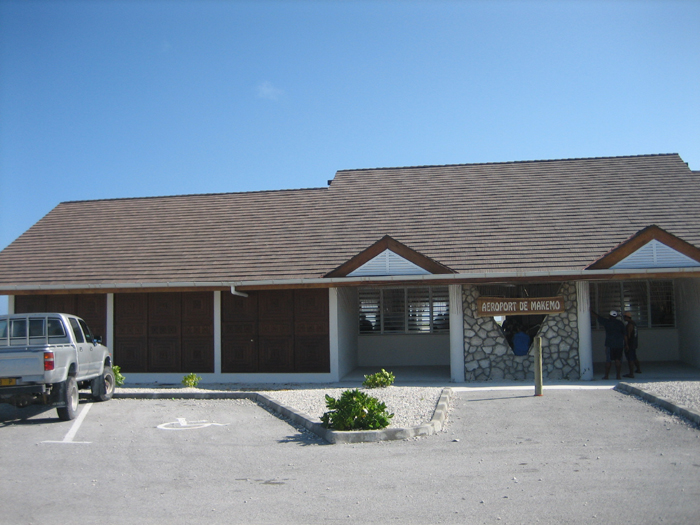
- IATA: MKP; ICAO: NTGM

Summary
- Serves: Makemo
- Elevation AMSL: 16 ft (4.9 m)
- Coordinates: 16°35′12.07″S 143°39′13.64″W

Map
- Location of the airport in French Polynesia

Runways
Direction	Length		Surface
Direction	ft	m	Surface
11/29	4,600	1,400	Asphalt

Makemo Airport (IATA: MKP, ICAO: NTGM) is an airport on Makemo in French Polynesia. The airport is 10 km (6.2 mi) WNW of the village of Pouheva.

== Airlines and destinations ==
Air Tahiti connects Makemo Airport to Faaʼa International Airport (Papeete).

== See also ==
- List of airports in French Polynesia
