= Apataki Airport =

Apataki Airport Aérodrome d'Apataki
- IATA: APK; ICAO: NTGD

Summary
- Airport type: Public
- Operator: DSEAC Polynésie Française
- Serves: Apataki
- Location: Apataki, Tuamotu, French Polynesia
- Elevation AMSL: 3 m / 10 ft
- Coordinates: 15°34′25″S 146°24′54″W

Map
- Location of the airport in French Polynesia

Runways
Direction	Length		Surface
Direction	m	ft	Surface
12/30	870	2,854	Paved
- Source: French AIP.

Apataki Airport (IATA: APK, ICAO: NTGD) is an airport on Apataki Atoll in the Tuamotu Archipelago of French Polynesia. The airport is 200 meters southwest of the village center of Niutahe, the only village of Apataki Atoll.

== Airlines and destinations ==
No scheduled flights as of May 2019.

== See also ==
- List of airports in French Polynesia
