= Fangatau Airport =

Airport in Teana, French Polynesia

Fangatau Airport Aérodrome de Fangatau
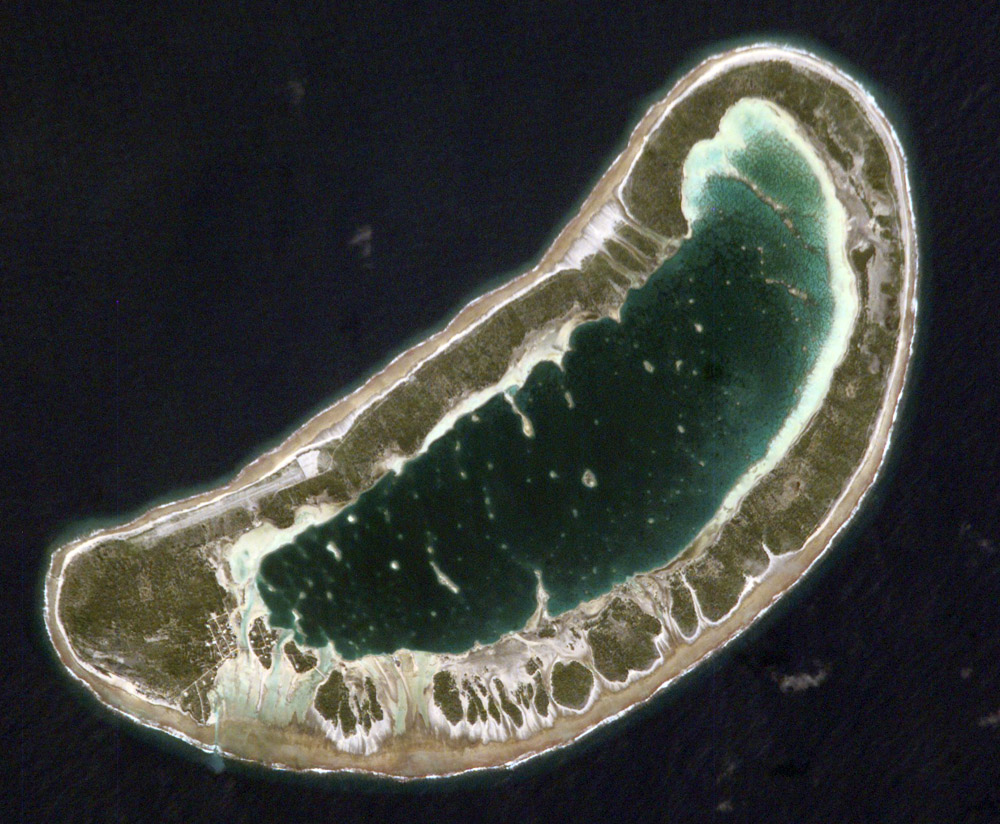
- NASA satellite image of Fangatau
- IATA: FGU; ICAO: NTGB

Summary
- Airport type: Public
- Operator: DSEAC Polynésie Française
- Serves: Fangatau, Tuamotu, French Polynesia
- Elevation AMSL: 3 m (9.8 ft)
- Coordinates: 15°49′11″S 140°53′13″W

Map
- Location of the airport in French Polynesia

Runways
Direction	Length		Surface
Direction	m	ft	Surface
07L/25R	1,200	3,937	Paved

Statistics (2021)
- Passengers: 2,135
- Aircraft movements: 84
- Cargo (metric tons): 5
- Source: French AIP.

Fangatau Airport (IATA: FGU, ICAO: NTGB) is an airport serving the village of Teana, located on the Fangatau atoll, in the Tuamotu group of atolls in French Polynesia, 960 kilometres (600 mi) from Tahiti.

Fangatau Airport was inaugurated in 1978.

== Airlines and destinations ==
Air Tahiti connects Fangatau Airport to Faaʼa International Airport (Papeete) and Raroia Airport.

== See also ==
- List of airports in French Polynesia
