= Faaʼa International Airport =

Main airport of French Polynesia

Faaʼa International Airport Aéroport international de Tahiti Faaʼa
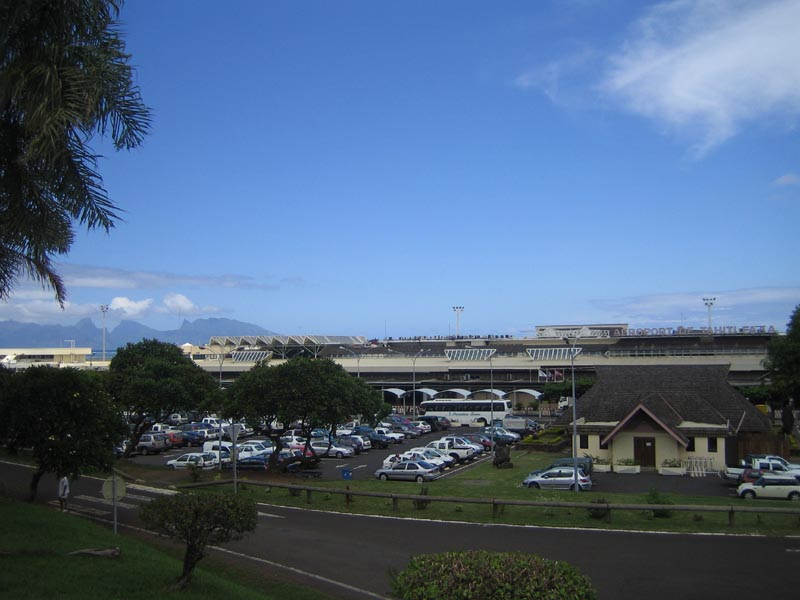
- IATA: PPT; ICAO: NTAA

Summary
- Airport type: Public
- Operator: SETIL – Aéroports
- Serves: Tahiti, French Polynesia, France
- Location: Papeete
- Hub for: Air Moana; Air Tahiti; Air Tahiti Nui
- Elevation AMSL: 2 m (6.6 ft)
- Coordinates: 17°33′24″S 149°36′41″W
- Website: www.tahiti-aeroport.pf

Map
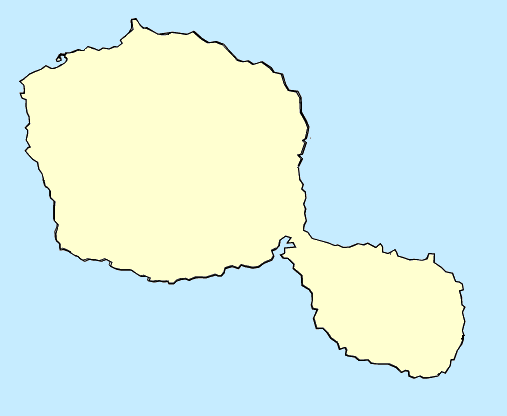
- Location in Tahiti PPT (French Polynesia)

Runways
Direction	Length		Surface
Direction	m	ft	Surface
04/22	3,420	11,220	Bituminous

Statistics (2023)
- Passengers: 1,708,098
- Passenger traffic change: ▲21.5%
- Aircraft movements: 44,226
- Aircraft movements change: ▲22.9%
- Sources: French AIP Aeroport.fr

Faaʼa International Airport (French: Aéroport international de Tahiti-Faaa; Tahitian: Taura'a Manureva no Fa'a'ā), also known as Tahiti International Airport (IATA: PPT, ICAO: NTAA), is the international airport of French Polynesia, located in the commune of Faʼaʼā, on the island of Tahiti. It is situated 5 km (3.1 mi) southwest of Papeete, the capital city of the overseas collectivity. It opened in 1960. Regional air carrier Air Tahiti and international air carrier Air Tahiti Nui are both based at the airport.

== Overview ==
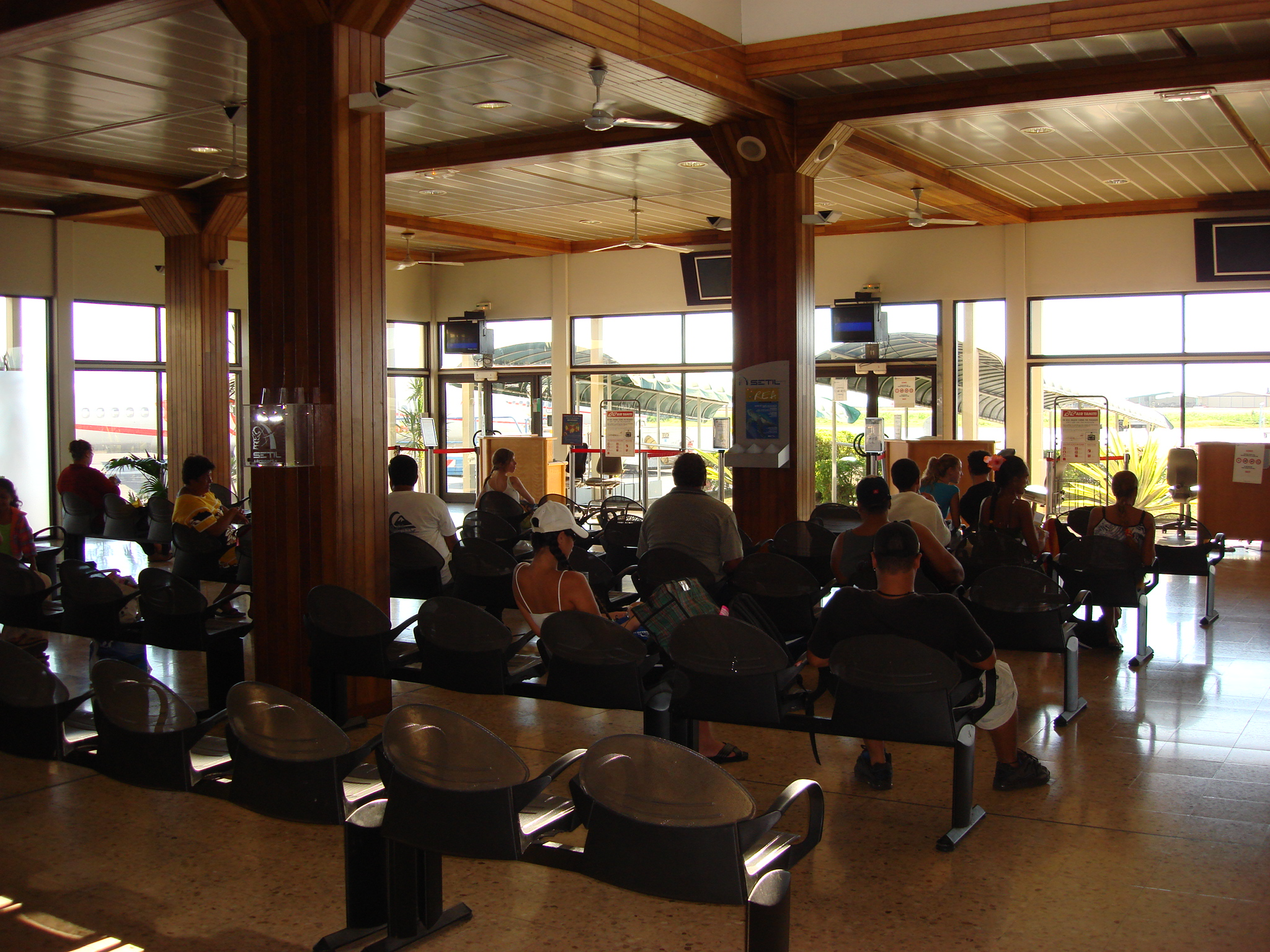
Waiting room

Faaʼa International Airport serves both domestic and international flights. Air Tahiti has daily flights to most other islands in French Polynesia and one international service to the Cook Islands. There are intercontinental flights to Canada (via the U.S.), Chile, Metropolitan France, Japan, New Zealand and the United States. The airport is on Tahiti, which is an island among the Windward Islands, the eastern part of the Society Islands. Because of limited level terrain, rather than leveling large stretches of sloping agricultural land, the airport is built primarily on reclaimed land on the coral reef just offshore.

The airport is operated by Setil Aéroports and has a single 3,420 m (11,220 ft) runway, that can accommodate aircraft up to Boeing 747 and Airbus A380 size.

== History ==
Prior to the construction of the airport, Papeete was served by Short Sandringham "Bermuda" flying boat seaplanes operated by Reseau Aerien Interinsulaire (RAI). There was a connecting service via Bora Bora Airport (BOB) to Los Angeles with an en route stop in Honolulu flown by Transports Aeriens Intercontinentaux (TAI), which was serving Bora Bora in 1960 with Douglas DC-7C propliners. Later the same year, following the opening of the new airport, TAI began serving Papeete directly with DC-7C flights once a week on a round trip routing of Nouméa (NOU) – Nadi (NAN) – Papeete (PPT) – Honolulu (HNL) – Los Angeles (LAX). U.S. based air carrier South Pacific Air Lines was also serving Papeete in 1960, with weekly nonstop flights to Honolulu operated with Lockheed L-1049 Super Constellation propliners. By 1962, South Pacific was operating weekly nonstop Super Constellation service to Pago Pago in American Samoa in addition to its flights to Honolulu.

Transports Aériens Intercontinentaux then introduced Douglas DC-8 jet service and in 1962 was operating nonstop DC-8 flights to Los Angeles, Honolulu and Nadi. The latter flight continued on to Nouméa, with connecting DC-8 service being flown to Paris via Nouméa in association with Air France via a number of intermediate stops en route. TAI subsequently merged with Union Aéromaritime de Transport in 1963 to form Union de Transports Aériens (UTA), which in turn continued to serve Papeete with DC-8 jet flights. In 1964, UTA was operating nonstop DC-8 service to Los Angeles, Honolulu and Nadi as well as direct one stop service to Nouméa, with the flights to Los Angeles offering connecting service to and from Air France nonstop flights between LAX and Paris Orly Airport (ORY).

By the mid 1960s, Pan American World Airways (Pan Am) was operating nonstop Boeing 707 jetliner flights to Los Angeles and Auckland, with direct one stop service to San Francisco via Los Angeles, and also direct to Honolulu via a stop at Pago Pago in American Samoa. By 1976, Pan Am was operating direct 707 service once a week to Dallas/Fort Worth and on to New York JFK Airport via stops in Pago Pago and Honolulu, and by 1979 was operating all of its flights from the airport with Boeing 747 wide body aircraft.

LAN-Chile, the predecessor of LATAM Chile, introduced Douglas DC-6B propliner service between the airport and Santiago, Chile, via a stop at Easter Island during the late 1960s, and by 1970 was operating Boeing 707 jet service from Santiago via Easter Island to Papeete, with direct connecting 707 service via its Santiago hub from Buenos Aires and Rio de Janeiro in South America as well as from Madrid, Paris and Frankfurt in Europe. LATAM Chile currently flies the Papeete – Easter Island – Santiago route with Boeing 787 aircraft.

In 1970, Union de Transports Aériens was operating all flights into the airport with long range Douglas DC-8-62 jetliners. UTA then introduced McDonnell Douglas DC-10-30 wide body jet service between Papeete and Los Angeles during the mid 1970s. By 1979, UTA was operating all of its Papeete flights with DC-10-30 jets, with nonstops to Los Angeles, Auckland and Nadi, and direct one stop service to Sydney and Nouméa as well as multistop service to Jakarta, Singapore, Bahrain and Paris Charles de Gaulle Airport (CDG). In 1983, UTA was operating Boeing 747 service into the airport in addition to its DC-10-30 flights.

The airport was previously served by several other international airlines, including AOM French Airlines and Qantas, with flights not only to their respective home countries but also to Los Angeles. In 1965, Qantas was also operating a service it called the "Fiesta Route" with a Boeing 707 flying round trip once a week on a routing of Sydney – Nadi – Papeete – Acapulco – Mexico City – Nassau – Bermuda – London Heathrow Airport. By 1976, Qantas was operating twice weekly nonstop Boeing 707 service to Vancouver, Canada in addition to its flights to Nadi and Sydney. In 1991, French air carrier Minerve was operating McDonnell Douglas DC-10-30 service once a week on a routing of Papeete – San Francisco – Paris Orly Airport.

Air New Zealand has served Tahiti for many years and was operating Douglas DC-8 jet service in 1968 with a routing of Auckland – Papeete – Los Angeles. By 1975, Air New Zealand flew a DC-8 four times a week from Auckland to Papete via Nandi and Rarotonga. In 1983, Air New Zealand was operating direct one stop, no change of plane Boeing 747 service twice a week between London Gatwick Airport (LGW) and Papeete via Los Angeles. By 1987, the airline was operating weekly nonstop Boeing 747 service to Dallas/Fort Worth (DFW) with this flight originating in Auckland and continuing on to London Gatwick (LGW) from DFW. Air New Zealand currently operates nonstop Boeing 787-9 service several days a week between the airport and Auckland.

According to the Official Airline Guide (OAG), by the 1980s and 1990s, major air carriers serving Papeete primarily operated wide body jetliners such as the Boeing 747-100, 747-200 (including B747-200 passenger/freighter combi aircraft), 747-300, 747-400, 767-300 or McDonnell Douglas DC-10-30 on their flights.

South Pacific Island Airways served the airport during the early 1980s with nonstop Boeing 707 flights to Honolulu. Also during the early 1980s, Air New Zealand, Polynesian Airlines and UTA were all operating Boeing 737-200 service to Papeete from several South Pacific island locations including Apia, Nadi, Niue and Rarotonga while local Tahiti-based air carrier Air Polynesia (also known as Air Polynésie and now Air Tahiti) was serving a number of islands in French Polynesia with Fairchild F-27, Fokker F27 and de Havilland Canada DHC-6 Twin Otter turboprop aircraft . Hawaiian Airlines was operating nonstop Douglas DC-8 service from Papeete to Honolulu by the late 1980s. By 1987, Continental Airlines was operating nonstop McDonnell Douglas DC-10-30 service twice a week from the airport to Los Angeles with this flight continuing on direct to Houston Intercontinental Airport (IAH).

In early 1989, five airlines were operating nonstop wide body jetliner flights from Papeete to Los Angeles (LAX) including Air France, Air New Zealand and Qantas with all three operating Boeing 747 service while at the same time Continental Airlines and UTA were both operating McDonnell Douglas DC-10 service on the route with a combined total of ten nonstops a week being operated by the five air carriers to LAX. From LAX, the Air France flights continued on to Paris Charles de Gaulle (CDG) while the Qantas flights continued on to San Francisco (SFO). In addition, UTA was operating three DC-10 flights a week nonstop to San Francisco (SFO) at this same time with two of these flights continuing on to Paris Charles de Gaulle (CDG) while the third flight continued on to LAX.

Air Tahiti Nui, which is based at the airport, was operating nonstop service between Papeete and New York JFK Airport during the mid 2000s with Airbus A340-300 aircraft; however, the airline was no longer flying this route by 2009. Air Tahiti Nui currently operates nonstop flights to Auckland, Los Angeles and Tokyo as well as direct service to Paris via Los Angeles and has added new Boeing 787-9 Dreamliner aircraft to its fleet.

In October 2017, the airport received its first charter flight from China, a Hainan Airlines Airbus A330.

== Airlines and destinations ==
Airlines	Destinations
Air France	Los Angeles, Paris–Charles de Gaulle
Air Moana	Atuona, Bora Bora, Fakarava, Huahine–Fare, Moorea, Nuku Hiva, Raiatea, Rangiroa
Air New Zealand	Auckland
Air Rarotonga	Rarotonga
Air Tahiti	Ahe, Arutua, Atuona, Bora Bora, Fakahina, Fakarava, Fangatau, Hao, Hikueru, Huahine–Fare, Kauehi, Makemo, Manihi, Mataiva, Maupiti, Moorea, Napuka, Nuku Hiva, Puka-Puka, Raiatea, Raivavae, Rangiroa, Raroia, Rarotonga, Rimatara, Rurutu, Takaroa, Tatakoto, Tikehau, Totegegie, Tubuai–Mataura
Air Tahiti Nui	Auckland, Los Angeles, Paris–Charles de Gaulle, Sydney (resumes 14 December 2026), Tokyo–Narita
Aircalin	Nouméa
French Bee	Paris–Orly, San Francisco
Hawaiian Airlines	Honolulu, Seattle/Tacoma (begins 12 June 2027)
United Airlines	San Francisco

== Traffic ==
Year	Passenger traffic
2000	1,548,327
2001	1,466,370
2002	1,370,254
2003	1,424,365
2004	1,413,572
2005	1,447,260
2006	1,535,825
2007	1,511,340
2008	1,379,832
2009	1,223,315
2010	1,183,273
2011	1,169,819
2012	1,152,593
2013	1,150,610
2014	1,171,618
2015	1,195,105
2016	1,248,517
2017	1,291,807
2018	1,393,849
2019	1,467,402
2020	663,913
2021	781,541
2022	1,405,538
2023	1,670,865
2024	1,666,068

== Ground transportation ==
Many buses come into the airport from Papeete, the main bus being the airport shuttle which goes along the Tahiti west coast freeway, which passes in front of the main terminal.

== Other facilities ==
The Air Tahiti Nui head office is in the Tua Rata Building on the airport property. The head office of Air Tahiti is also on the airport property.

== Accidents and incidents ==
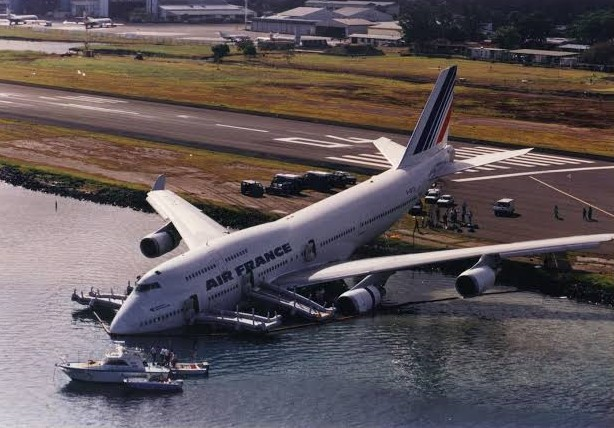
Air France Flight 072

- On 22 July 1973, Pan Am Flight 816, a Boeing 707, crashed into the sea just after take-off, killing 78 of 79 occupants.
- On February 19, 1985, a UTA DC-10 operating from Los Angeles to Auckland via Papeete made an emergency landing at Rangiroa following a telephoned bomb threat. Passengers and luggage were removed and flown to Tahiti onboard French military aircraft. The aircraft was searched and no bomb was found. The aircraft was flown empty to Papeete a week later.
- On 12 September 1993, Air France Flight 072, a Boeing 747–428 from Los Angeles to Papeete, ran off the runway on landing and into a lagoon. The nose of the 747 was submerged in the water. There were no fatalities.
- On 24 December 2000, Hawaiian Airlines Flight 481, a DC-10-10, overshot the runway on landing and slid off the tarmac during a storm. There was one minor injury and no fatalities.
- On 9 August 2007, Air Moorea Flight 1121 crashed into the ocean shortly after takeoff from Moorea Airport on Moorea Island in French Polynesia, killing all 20 people on board. It was bound for Tahiti's Fa'a'ā International Airport on a regular 7-minute service, one of the shortest on earth, scheduled 40 to 50 times a day. The crash resulted from loss of control due to failure of the airplane's elevator cable. Frequent takeoff and landing are believed to have been a major factor in the crash, because of wear and tear on the elevator cables, inspected only at fixed time intervals, regardless of usage. Another factor may have been jet-blast from large planes pushing back from the ramp at Fa'a'ā International.

== See also ==
- List of airports in French Polynesia
