= Rurutu Airport =

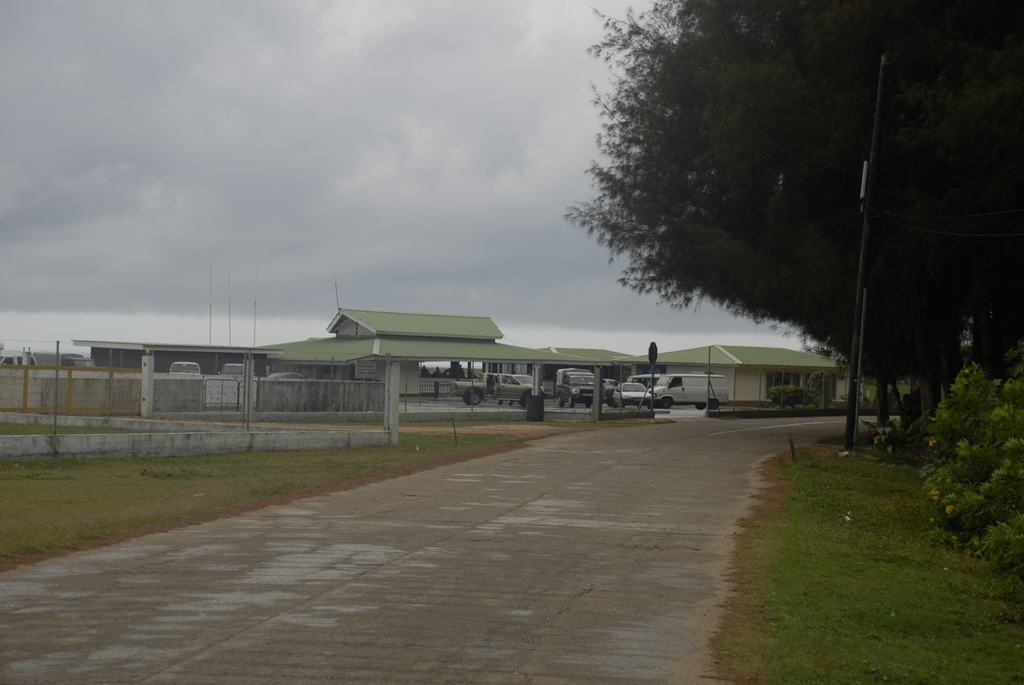
- IATA: RUR; ICAO: NTAR

Summary
- Serves: Rurutu
- Location: Rurutu, French Polynesia
- Hub for: Air Tahiti
- Elevation AMSL: 3 m (9.8 ft)
- Coordinates: 22°25′55″S 151°21′58″W

Map
- Location of the airport in French Polynesia

Runways
Direction	Length		Surface
Direction	m	ft	Surface
09/27	1,450	4,757	Asphalt

Rurutu Airport is an airport on Rurutu in French Polynesia (IATA: RUR, ICAO: NTAR). The airport is located 2.5 kilometres (1.6 mi) northeast of Moerai. The airport was built in 1977.

== Airlines and destinations ==
Air Tahiti connects Rurutu Airport to Faaʼa International Airport (Papeete), Rimatara Airport, and Tubuai Mataura Airport.

== See also ==
- List of airports in French Polynesia
