= Arutua Airport =

Airport in French Polynesia

- IATA: AXR; ICAO: NTGU

Summary
- Serves: Arutua, French Polynesia
- Coordinates: 15°14′47″S 146°37′13″W

Map
- Location of airport in French Polynesia

Runways
Direction	Length		Surface
Direction	ft	m	Surface
10/28	4,265	1,300	Paved

Arutua Airport is an airport on Arutua atoll in French Polynesia (IATA: AXR, ICAO: NTGU). The airport is 13 km north of the village of Rautini.

== Airlines and destinations ==
Air Tahiti connects Arutua Airport to Ahe Airport and Faaʼa International Airport (Papeete).

== See also ==
- List of airports in French Polynesia
