= Nuku Hiva Airport =

Airport in Nuku Hiva, Marquesas Islands, French Polynesia

- IATA: NHV; ICAO: NTMD

Summary
- Location: Nuku Hiva in the Marquesas Islands, French Polynesia
- Coordinates: 08°47′44″S 140°13′43″W

Map
- Location of the airport in French Polynesia

Runways
Direction	Length		Surface
Direction	ft	m	Surface
06/24	5,571	1,698	Paved

Nuku Hiva Airport is an airport on Nuku Hiva in the Marquesas Islands, French Polynesia. The airport is located 19 km (12 mi) northwest of the main village of Taiohae. It is also known as Nuku A Taha ("Deserted Land"). The drive to Taiohae is over dirt roads and takes 90 minutes.

Plans for the airport were revealed in 1976. It was to be constructed in two stages, with the first phase consisting of a 1,500 meter runway, which would be expanded to 2,650 meters in phase two. Construction began in 1979. The second phase was never built.

== Airlines and destinations ==
=== Passenger ===
Airlines	Destinations
Air Moana	Papeete
Air Tahiti	Atuona, Papeete, Ua Huka, Ua Pou

== See also ==
- List of airports in French Polynesia
