= Tubuai – Mataura Airport =

Airport in French Polynesia

- Map of the island of Tubuai. The airport is on the left, indicated with "Pointe Teonemarua"
- IATA: TUB; ICAO: NTAT

Summary
- Airport type: Public
- Operator: DSEAC Polynésie française
- Serves: Tubuai, Austral Islands, French Polynesia
- Elevation AMSL: 5 m (16 ft)
- Coordinates: 23°21′55″S 149°31′27″W

Map
- Location of the airport in French Polynesia

Runways
Direction	Length		Surface
Direction	m	ft	Surface
03/21	1,500	4,921	Asphalt
- Sources: AIP, GCM, STV

Tubuai – Mataura Airport (IATA: TUB, ICAO: NTAT) is an airport on Tubuai in French Polynesia. The airport is 4.8 kilometres (3.0 mi) southwest of the village of Mataura.

== Airlines and destinations ==
Air Tahiti connects Tubuai Airport to Faaʼa International Airport (Papeete), Raivavae Airport, and Rurutu Airport.
