= Tatakoto =

Atoll in French Polynesia

- Commune
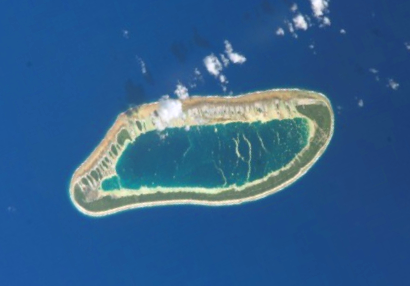
- NASA picture of Tatakoto Atoll

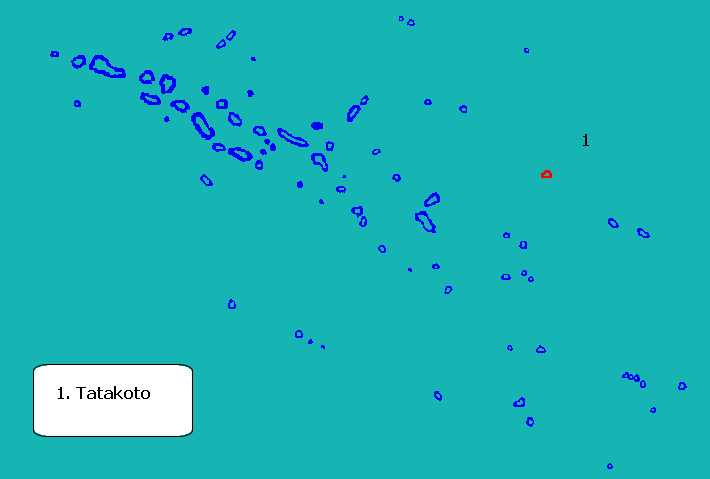
- Location of Tatakoto
- Coordinates: 17°21′06″S 138°24′05″W
- Country: France
- Overseas collectivity: French Polynesia
- Subdivision: Îles Tuamotu-Gambier
- Area^{1}: 7.3 km^{2} (2.8 sq mi)
- Population (2022): 180
  - Density: 25/km^{2} (64/sq mi)
- Time zone: UTC−10:00
- INSEE/Postal code: 98751 /98783
- ^{1} French Land Register data, which excludes lakes, ponds, glaciers > 1 km^{2} (0.386 sq mi or 247 acres) and river estuaries.

Tatakoto is an atoll in the Tuamotu group in French Polynesia.

Tatakoto is one of the more isolated atolls of the Tuamotus. It is situated in the east of the archipelago, 1,182 kilometres (734 miles) from Tahiti. This atoll is 14 kilometres (9 miles) long and 3.5 kilometres (2 miles) wide. It has one large island and 65 islets separated by numerous channels on the reef surrounding the lagoon. The islands are mostly located on its windward side (south). All the islands are flat, not much higher than the ocean level. Its land area is about 7.3 km^{2}, and the lagoon area is about 20 km^{2}.

The main settlement is Tumukuru, and the total population was 180 in the 2022 census.

== History ==
Tatakoto Atoll was sighted the same day by two Spaniards. In the second expedition of the Águila, the two captains, Domingo de Bonechea and José Andía y Varela, separated when leaving Peru and did not see each other until reaching Tahiti. On 29 October 1774 (the day of Saint Narcissus) the two disembarked on Tatakoto without meeting. They named the island "San Narciso". Historically the island was also known as "d'Augier".

Chronicler José Andía described the atoll as "extremely agreeable to the eyes by being very populated by shrubs." At the beginning of the twentieth century France established a colony and replanted the island with coconut palms, which still cover the island.

Tatakoto Airport was inaugurated in 1979.

== Administration ==
Administratively Tatakoto Atoll has its own commune, which belongs to the Îles Tuamotu-Gambier administrative subdivision of French Polynesia.

== Transport ==
The atoll is served by the Tatakoto Airport (IATA: TKV, ICAO: NTGO).
