= Fakahina Airfield =

Public airfield in Fakahina

- IATA: FHZ; ICAO: NTKH

Summary
- Airport type: Public
- Location: Fakahina
- Elevation AMSL: 10 ft / 3 m
- Coordinates: 15°59′31″S 140°9′53″W

Map

Runways
Direction	Length		Surface
Direction	ft	m	Surface
10/28		900	Concrete

Fakahina Airfied (IATA: FHZ, ICAO: NTKH)is a public operational airport located at in Fakahina atoll in French Polynesia.

== Specifications ==
The Fakahina Airfield has one runway with a direction 10/28 and a length of 900m. The runway has a concrete surface.

The airport is located at an elevation of 10 ft (3 m) from mean sea level and it is open to public.
