= Hao Airport =

Airport on Hao Island, French Polynesia

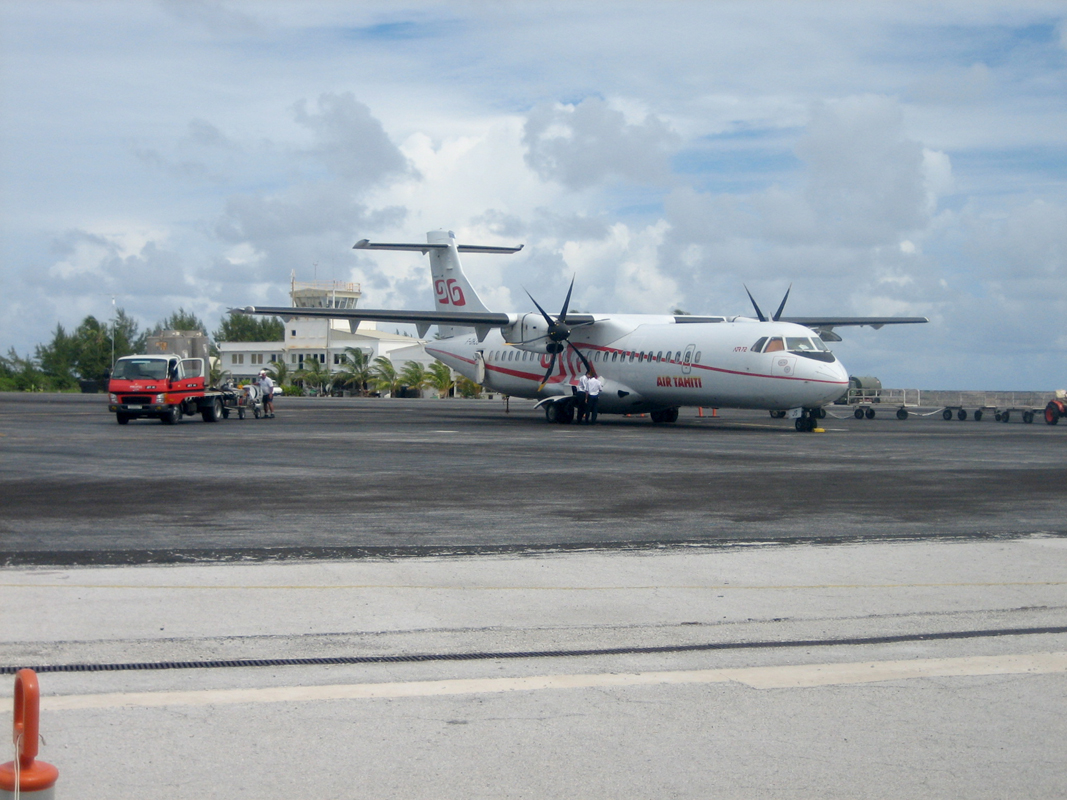
- IATA: HOI; ICAO: NTTO

Summary
- Airport type: Public
- Operator: DSEAC Polynésie Française
- Serves: Hao Island
- Location: Hao Island, French Polynesia
- Elevation AMSL: 15 ft (4.6 m)
- Coordinates: 18°04′29″S 140°56′45″W

Map
- Location of the airport in French Polynesia

Runways
Direction	Length		Surface
Direction	m	ft	Surface
12L/30R	3,380	11,089	Asphalt
- Sources: DAFIF; French AIP

Hao Airport (IATA: HOI, ICAO: NTTO) is an airport on Hao Island in French Polynesia. The airport is 8 kilometres (5.0 mi) from the village of Otepa. Its unusually long runway (for the atoll's present population) was constructed to permit the heavy aircraft transporting materials for nuclear tests to land. Their cargoes would be transported onward to nuclear test sites by ships.

Hao airport was a designated emergency landing site for the NASA Space Shuttle.

== Airlines and destinations ==
Air Tahiti connects Hao Airport to Faaʼa International Airport (Papeete) and Totegegie Airport.

== See also ==
- List of airports in French Polynesia
