= Manihi Airport =

Airport in French Polynesia

Manihi Airport Aérodrome de Manihi
- IATA: XMH; ICAO: NTGI

Summary
- Airport type: Public
- Operator: DSEAC Polynésie Française
- Serves: Manihi, French Polynesia
- Location: Paeva
- Elevation AMSL: 14 ft (4.3 m)
- Coordinates: 14°26′15″S 146°04′15″W

Map
- Location of the airport in French Polynesia

Runways
Direction	Length		Surface
Direction	m	ft	Surface
04/22	930	3,051	Asphalt
- Source: French AIP.

Manihi Airport (IATA: XMH, ICAO: NTGI) is an airport serving Manihi, an atoll in the Tuamotu archipelago in French Polynesia. It is located 3 km northwest of the village of Paeva.

== Airlines and destinations ==
Air Tahiti connects Manihi Airport to Ahe Airport and Faaʼa International Airport (Papeete).

== See also ==
- List of airports in French Polynesia
