= Fakahina =

Atoll in French Polynesia

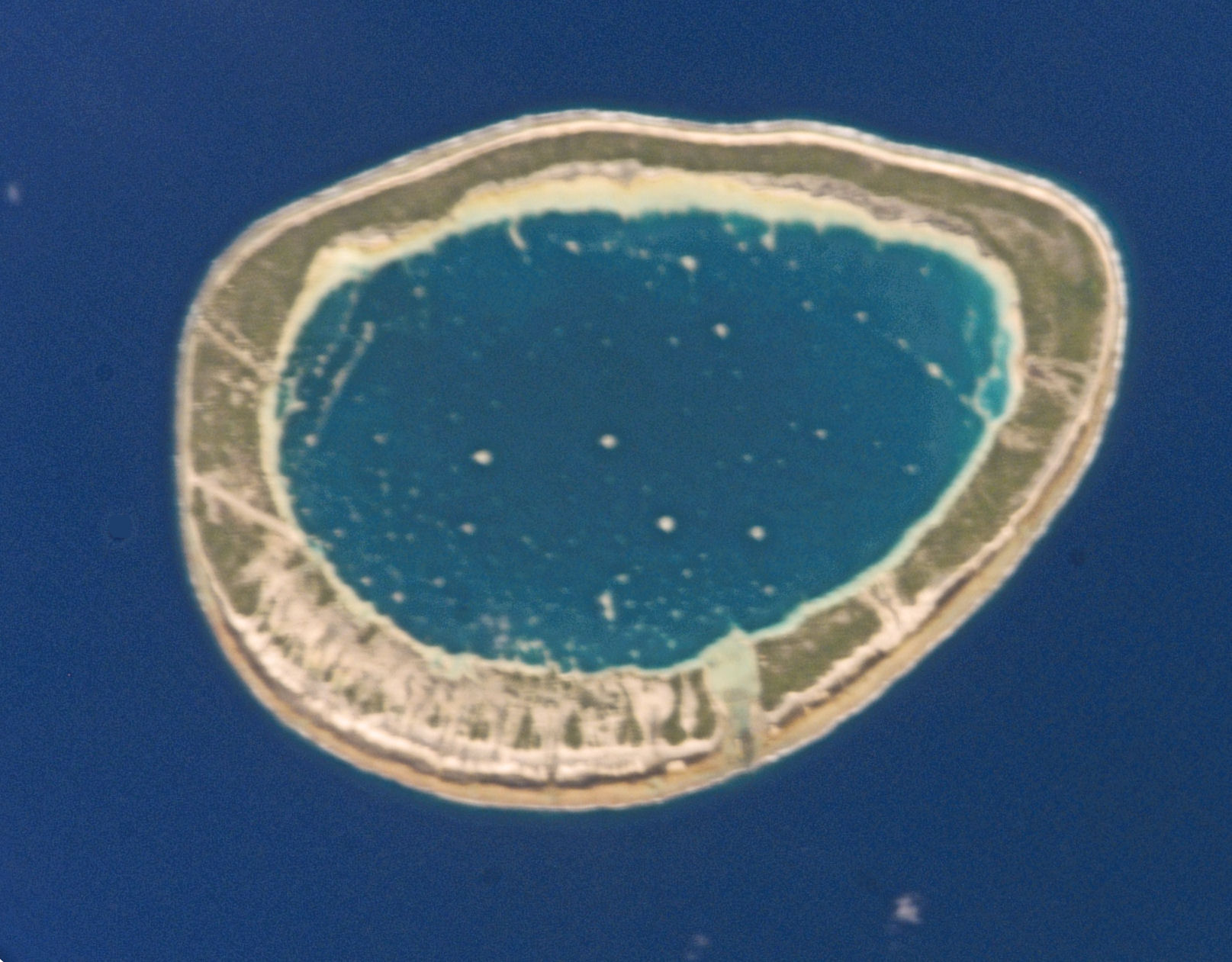
- NASA picture of Fakahina Atoll

- Location within French Polynesia

Geography
- Location: Pacific Ocean
- Coordinates: 15°59′S 140°11′W
- Archipelago: Tuamotus
- Area: 20 km^{2} (7.7 sq mi) (lagoon); 11.55 km^{2} (4 sq mi) (above water)
- Length: 9 km (5.6 mi)
- Width: 6.3 km (3.91 mi)

Administration
- France
- Overseas collectivity: French Polynesia
- Administrative subdivision: Îles Tuamotu-Gambier
- Commune: Fangatau
- Largest settlement: Tarione

Demographics
- Population: 155 (2012)
- Pop. density: 19/km^{2} (49/sq mi)

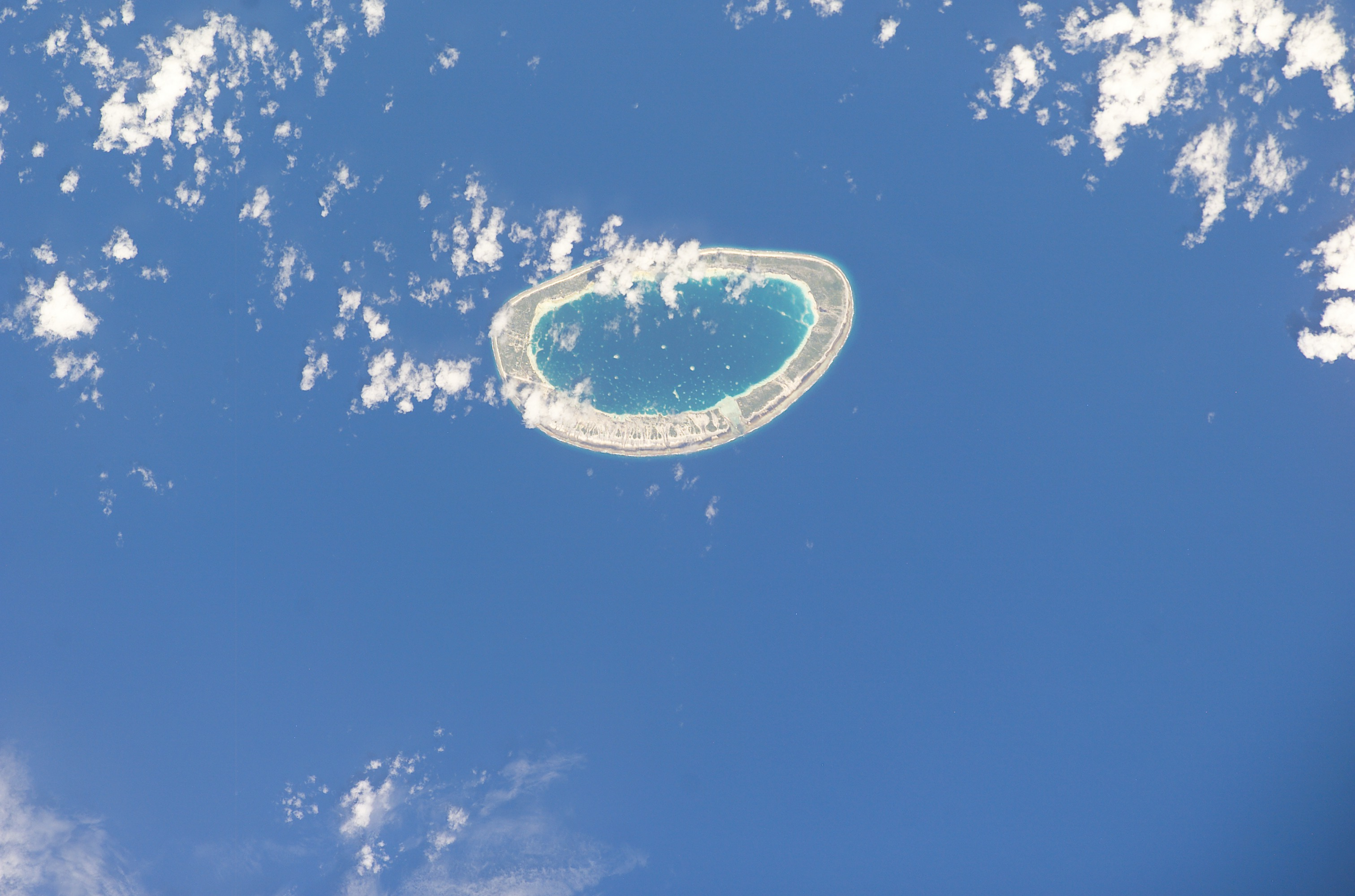
Another NASA picture of Fakahina.

Fakahina, or Kaīna, is a small atoll in the north of the Tuamotu group in French Polynesia. The nearest land is Fangatau Atoll, located 72 km to the north-west. Fakahina's length is 9 kilometres (5.6 miles) and its maximum width 6.3 kilometres (3.9 miles). It has a land area of 11.55 square kilometres (4 square miles) and a lagoon area of 20 square kilometres (8 square miles). There is no pass connecting the lagoon with the ocean.

Fakahina has 155 inhabitants. The main village is Tarione.

== History ==
The first recorded European to arrive to Fakahina Atoll was Otto von Kotzebue, sailing in the service of the Russian tsars, in 1824. This atoll appears as "Predpriati" in some maps.

At the beginning of the 20th century part of the population of Fakahina was moved to Puka-Puka to work in the production of copra.

== Administration ==
Fakahina belongs to the commune of Fangatau, which consists of Fangatau Atoll, as well as the atoll and associated commune of Fakahina.
