= List of shipwrecks in 1770 =

The List of shipwrecks in 1770 includes some of the ships sunk, wrecked, or otherwise lost during 1770.

table of contents
1770
Jan	Feb	Mar	Apr
May	Jun	Jul	Aug
Sep	Oct	Nov	Dec
Unknown date

== January ==
=== 5 January ===
List of shipwrecks: 5 January 1770
Ship	State	Description
Harlequin	Great Britain	The ship struck rocks off the Isles of Scilly and consequently foundered 8 leagues (24 nautical miles (44 km)) south west of the Isles of Scilly. Her crew were rescued by Thompson (Great Britain). Harlequin was on a voyage from North Carolina, British America to Hull, Yorkshire.
William and Hannah	Great Britain	The ship was driven ashore and wrecked near King's Lynn, Norfolk with the loss of all but one of her crew. She was on a voyage from Philadelphia, Pennsylvania, British America to Leith, Lothian.

=== 11 January ===
List of shipwrecks: 11 January 1770
Ship	State	Description
St. Patrick	Great Britain	The ship was wrecked on a reef off Vale, Guernsey, Channel Islands with the loss of thirteen of the fourteen people on board. She was on a voyage from Grenada to London.

=== 12 January ===
List of shipwrecks: 12 January 1770
Ship	State	Description
John and Sally	Great Britain	The sloop was driven ashore and wrecked on the coast of Lincolnshire.

=== 13 January ===
List of shipwrecks: 13 January 1770
Ship	State	Description
Prosperous	Great Britain	The ship was lost at St. Antonio.

=== 16 January ===
List of shipwrecks: 16 January 1770
Ship	State	Description
Expedition	Great Britain	African slave trade: The ship foundered in the Atlantic Ocean about 35 leagues (105 nautical miles (194 km) off the coast of Senegal. Her crew and a passenger were rescued by James (Great Britain), but not the 110 slaves on board.

=== 27 January ===
List of shipwrecks: 27 January 1770
Ship	State	Description
HMS Jamaica	(Kingdom of Great Britain) Royal Navy	The Hind-class sloop was wrecked off the coast of Cuba.
Leimuiden	Dutch East India Company	The East Indiaman, a frigate, foundered off Boa Vista, Cape Verde Islands. Most of her 329 crew survived.

=== Unknown date ===
List of shipwrecks: Unknown date 1770
Ship	State	Description
Admiral Pircher	Great Britain	The ship was wrecked on the coast of Sweden.
Carleton	Great Britain	The ship foundered in the Bay of Biscay off Saint-Jean-de-Luz, Spain. She was on a voyage from Louisbourg, Nova Scotia, British America to San Sebastián, Spain.
Cecilia	Great Britain	The ship was wrecked on the Morant Keys. She was on a voyage from Africa to Jamaica.
Denbia	Great Britain	The ship was driven ashore and wrecked at Hoylake, Cheshire. Her crew were rescued. She was on a voyage from South Carolina, British America to Liverpool, Lancashire.
Elizabeth	Ireland	The ship foundered in the Atlantic Ocean off Long Island, New York, British America. Her crew took to the boat but were presumed to have perished. She was on a voyage from Dublin to New York City.
Emanuel	Ireland	The ship was lost on the French coast. She was on a voyage from Cork to Bordeaux.
Gebroeders Lelks	Dutch Republic	The ship was lost on the coast of South Wales. She was on a voyage from Bordeaux, France to Rotterdam.
Industrious	Great Britain	The ship foundered in the North Sea with the loss of all but one of her crew. She was on a voyage from Amsterdam, Dutch Republic to Leith, Lothian.
Neptune	Great Britain	The ship was wrecked on the coast of Sweden.
Peter Pieters	flag unknown	The ship was driven ashore on Saltholm, Denmark.
Providence	Great Britain	The ship was driven ashore at Calais, Kingdom of France. She was on a voyage from London to Lisbon, Portugal.
Signet	Great Britain	The ship foundered. Her crew were rescued by a Dutch vessel. She was on a voyage from South Carolina, British America to a British port.
Whaley	Great Britain	The ship foundered in the Atlantic Ocean off Land's End, Cornwall with the loss of all hands. She was on a voyage from London to Chester, Cheshire.
Jean	Great Britain	At latitude 34 and longitude 60, the brigantine was hit by violent wind and left unable to move. No one came to save the crew; a small boat on its way to the Isles met with the ship, but refused to help the crew. Only the Captain was alive out of a crew of seven when he was found on March first. Owned by Boston, she was on a voyage from Boston to Suriname. The ship was possibly wrecked in February.

== February ==
=== 7 February ===
List of shipwrecks: 7 February 1770
Ship	State	Description
John & Mary	Great Britain	The ship was driven ashore and wrecked at Kimmeridge, Dorset She was on a voyage from London to Dartmouth, Devon.

=== 8 February ===
List of shipwrecks: 8 February 1770
Ship	State	Description
Cecilia	Great Britain	The ship was driven ashore and wrecked at Margate, Kent. She was on a voyage from Great Yarmouth, Norfolk to Dublin, Ireland.
Hannah	(Kingdom of Great Britain) Guernsey	The ship struck rocks at Guernsey, was driven out to sea and foundered in the English Channel. she was on a voyage from Lisbon, Portugal to Guernsey.
Good Intent	Great Britain	The ship was driven ashore at Margate. She was on a voyage from Great Yarmouth to Dublin. Good Intent was later refloated.
Liberty	Great Britain	The ship was driven ashore at Margate. She was on a voyage from Wells-next-the-Sea, Norfolk to Dublin. Liberty was later refloated.
Mayflower	Great Britain	The ship was driven ashore at Margate. She was on a voyage from Great Yarmouth to Dublin. Mayflower was later refloated.
Three Sisters	Great Britain	The ship was driven ashore at Margate. She was on a voyage from King's Lynn, Norfolk to Bristol, Gloucestershire. Three Sisters was later refloated.

=== 15 February ===
List of shipwrecks: 15 February 1770
Ship	State	Description
Three Brothers	Great Britain	The ship was driven ashore and wrecked at Workington, Cumberland. She was on a voyage from Padstow, Cornwall to Workington.

=== 18 February ===
List of shipwrecks: 18 February 1770
Ship	State	Description
Prince of Orange	Great Britain	The ship was driven ashore and wrecked near Brighthelmstone, Sussex. She was on a voyage from Rotterdam, Dutch Republic to Liverpool, Lancashire.
Speedwell	Great Britain	The ship foundered. She was on a voyage from Newcastle upon Tyne, Northumberland to Bayonne, France.

=== 28 February ===
List of shipwrecks: 28 February 1770
Ship	State	Description
Nancy	Great Britain	The ship was lost whilst on a voyage from Dartmouth, Devon to Liverpool, Lancashire.

=== Unknown date ===
List of shipwrecks: Unknown date 1770
Ship	State	Description
Ann	Great Britain	The ship was driven ashore at Margate, Kent. She was on a voyage from London to Dublin, Ireland.
Cæssar	Great Britain	The ship was wrecked on the French coast with the loss of all hands. She was on a voyage from Exeter, Devon to London.
Fanny	Great Britain	The ship was driven ashore and wrecked near Boulogne, France with the loss of two lives.
Good Intent	Great Britain	The ship was driven ashore near Margate.
James	Great Britain	The ship foundered in the Swin. She was on a voyage from Newcastle upon Tyne, Northumberland to London.
Jane	Great Britain	The ship was lost near Beachy Head, Sussex with the loss of three lives.
John	Great Britain	The ship foundered in St. George's Channel. Her crew were rescued by Brothers (Great Britain). John was on a voyage from the Clyde to Figueira da Foz, Portugal.
Knight	Great Britain	The ship was driven ashore and wrecked near Formby, Lancashire. She was on a voyage from Liverpool, Lancashire to Africa.
London	Great Britain	The ship was driven ashore near "Lee". She was on a voyage from Hull, Yorkshire to London.
Nancy	Great Britain	The ship was driven ashore at Holyhead, Anglesey. She was on a voyage from Liverpool to Africa.
Richard & Elizabeth	Great Britain	The ship departed from Chichester, Sussex for an Irish port in early February. No further trace, presumed foundered with the loss of all hands.
Richards	Ireland	The ship was lost whilst on a voyage from Dublin to Cádiz, Spain.
St. Jean	France	The ship was driven ashore and wrecked near Dunkirk with the loss of all hands. She was on a voyage from Charente to Dunkirk.

== March ==
=== 9 March ===
List of shipwrecks: 9 March 1770
Ship	State	Description
Ann & Dorothy	(Kingdom of Great Britain) British America.	The ship was lost near Cape Hatteras, North Carolina. She was on a voyage from Barbados to Philadelphia, Pennsylvania.

=== 11 March ===
List of shipwrecks: 11 March 1770
Ship	State	Description
S. S. das Doras	Spain	The snow was wrecked at Faro, Portugal. She was on a voyage from Cádiz to Galicia.
Topsham	Great Britain	The ship was driven ashore and wrecked at Pool, Dorset. Her crew were rescued. She was on a voyage from Pool to Dartmouth, Devon.

=== 13 March ===
List of shipwrecks: 13 March 1770
Ship	State	Description
HMS Swift	(Kingdom of Great Britain) Royal Navy	The Swift-class ship-sloop ran aground at Puerto Desire, Viceroyalty of Peru and sank. Eighty-eight crew survived.

=== 17 March ===
List of shipwrecks: 17 March 1770
Ship	State	Description
Letuchy (Летучий, 'Flying')	Imperial Russian Navy	The packet boat was wrecked near Oitylo, Greece. Her crew were rescued.

=== 31 March ===
List of shipwrecks: 31 March 1770
Ship	State	Description
De Oranien Baum Revert	Duchy of Holstein	The ship ran aground at Penzance, Cornwall, Great Britain and was wrecked. She was on a voyage from Bordeaux, France to Flensburg.

=== Unknown date ===
List of shipwrecks: Unknown date 1770
Ship	State	Description
Ann & Dorothy	(Kingdom of Great Britain) British America	The ship was wrecked north of Cape Hatteras, North Carolina. She was on a voyage from Barbados to Philadelphia, Pennsylvania.
Frankfort Merchant	Great Britain	The ship sank in the Elbe. She was on a voyage from Hull, Yorkshire to Bremen.
George	Great Britain	The sloop was wrecked on the Nass Sands, in the Bristol Channel with the loss of a crew member. She was on a voyage from London to Chepstow, Monmouthshire and Newnham, Gloucestershire.
Rump & Dozen	Great Britain	The ship was lost on the Spanish coast. She was on a voyage from Spain to London.
St. George	Great Britain	The ship was driven ashore and wrecked on the French coast. She was on a voyage from London to Newnham, Gloucestershire.
St. Paul	Great Britain	The ship was driven ashore at Calais, France.

== April ==
=== 2 April ===
List of shipwrecks: 2 April 1770
Ship	State	Description
St. Cecilia Maria	Denmark	The ship was driven ashore and wrecked near Seaford, Sussex, Great Britain. She was on a voyage from St. Ubes, Portugal to Copenhagen.

=== 6 April ===
List of shipwrecks: 6 April 1770
Ship	State	Description
HMS Alarm	(Kingdom of Great Britain) Royal Navy	The Niger-class frigate ran aground off Marseille, France and was severely damaged. She was refloated and taken in to Marseille. Subsequently repaired and returned to service.

=== 15 April ===
List of shipwrecks: 15 April 1770
Ship	State	Description
Charming Polly	Great Britain	The ship was wrecked off Cape Hatteras, North Carolina, British America. Her crew survived. She was on a voyage from London to Oracock, North Carolina.
Lillie	Great Britain	The snow was driven ashore and wrecked 10 nautical miles (19 km) north of Cape Hatteras. Her crew survived. She was on a voyage from Glasgow, Renfrewshire to Oracock.
Polly	flag unknown	The sloop was driven ashore and wrecked 5 nautical miles (9.3 km) south of Cape Hatteras. She was on a voyage from the West Indies to North Carolina.

=== 20 April ===
List of shipwrecks: 20 April 1770
Ship	State	Description
Basseterre	Great Britain	The ship was driven ashore and wrecked at Kingsdown, Kent. Her crew were rescued. She was on a voyage from Saint Kitts to London.

=== 21 April ===
List of shipwrecks: 21 April 1770
Ship	State	Description
William	Great Britain	The ship foundered in the Irish Sea. Her crew were rescued by Bell (Great Britain). William was on a voyage from Liverpool, Lancashire to Irvine, Ayrshire.

=== 30 April ===
List of shipwrecks: 30 April 1770
Ship	State	Description
Poltava (Полтава)	Imperial Russian Navy	The ship capsized in the port of Kronstadt, but didn't fully sink due to shallow depth. Unable to refloat her after a two-day salvage operation, she was eventually dismantled in situ.

=== Unknown date ===
List of shipwrecks: Unknown date 1770
Ship	State	Description
Beverley	Great Britain	The ship was driven ashore near Liverpool, Lancashire. She was on a voyage from London to Liverpool.
Bourdeaux	France	The ship was driven ashore crewless and wrecked in the Isles of Scilly, Great Britain.
Charming Nelly	Ireland	The ship was driven ashore and wrecked at Exicare, Portugal with the loss of all hands. She was on a voyage from Lisbon, Portugal to Dublin.
Duke of Cumberland	Great Britain	The ship was driven ashore and wrecked at Parkgate, Cheshire. She was on a voyage from Wisbech, Cambridgeshire to Chester, Cheshire.
Felke & Maria	Dutch Republic	The ship was driven ashore and wrecked near Camelford, Cornwall, Great Britain with the loss of all hands. She was on a voyage from Lisbon, Portugal to Amsterdam.
Frederick	Great Britain	The ship was lost near Stettin. She was on a voyage from Stettin to London.
Freedom	Great Britain	The ship sank at Memell, Prussia.
Hope	Great Britain	The ship sank at Memell.
North Star	Dutch Republic	The ship ran aground and was wrecked on the south coast of the Isle of Wight, Great Britain. She was on a voyage from Bayonne, France to Middelburg.
Patriot	Stettin	The ship was driven ashore and capsized near "Obeck".
Prince of Wales	Great Britain	The ship was driven ashore in the River Thames at Gravesend, Kent or Shoeburyness, Essex. She was on a voyage from Porto, Portugal to London. Prince of Wales was later refloated and taken in to London.
Providence	Great Britain	The ship foundered in the Atlantic Ocean off Land's End, Cornwall with the loss of all but three of her crew. She was on a voyage from London to Dublin.
Rain	Ireland	The ship was driven ashore and wrecked near Ennis, County Clare. She was on a voyage from New York, British America to Galway.
Soorpeon	Great Britain	The ship foundered in Liverpool Bay off Parkgate, Cheshire. She was on a voyage from Liverpool and Chester to Venice.
St Elizabeth	Great Britain	The ship was lost in Glover's Reach. She was on a voyage from London to the Bay of Honduras.

== May ==
=== 5 May ===
List of shipwrecks: 5 May 1770
Ship	State	Description
Susannah	Great Britain	The ship foundered. Eight of her crew were rescued by Industry (Great Britain).

=== 13 May ===
List of shipwrecks: 13 May 1770
Ship	State	Description
Nadezhda (Надежда, 'Hope')	Imperial Russian Navy	The galley was driven ashore at Kronstadt. She was declared a total loss and dismantled in situ.

=== 31 May ===
List of shipwrecks: 31 May 1770
Ship	State	Description
Christiana	Hamburg	The ship was driven ashore at Dungeness, Kent, Great Britain. She was on a voyage from Alicante, Spain to Hamburg.

== June ==
=== 2 June ===
List of shipwrecks: 2 June 1770
Ship	State	Description
Unity	Ireland	The ship was wrecked on the Île d'Yeu, France with the loss of all hands. She was on a voyage from Limerick to Bordeaux, France.

=== 3 June ===
List of shipwrecks: 3 June 1770
Ship	State	Description
Planters Welvard	Dutch Republic	The West Indiaman was driven ashore at Porthcawl Point, Glamorgan, Great Britain with the loss of fifteen lives. She was on a voyage from Suriname to a Dutch port.

=== 7 June ===
List of shipwrecks: 7 June 1770
Ship	State	Description
Dove	(Kingdom of Great Britain) British America	The sloop was driven ashore and wrecked at Charles Town, South Carolina.

=== 11 June ===
List of shipwrecks: 11 June 1770
Ship	State	Description
HMS Endeavour	(Kingdom of Great Britain) Royal Navy	The barque ran aground on the Great Barrier Reef and was severely damaged. She was beached to enable temporary repairs to be made. Subsequently repaired and returned to service.

=== Unknown date ===
List of shipwrecks: Unknown date 1770
Ship	State	Description
Dobson	Great Britain	The ship ran aground in the River Mersey at Liverpool, Lancashire and was severely damaged. She was on a voyage from Barbados to Liverpool.

== July ==
=== 2 July ===
List of shipwrecks: 2 July 1770
Ship	State	Description
John and Esther	Great Britain	The ship was lost at "Trimlade". Her crew were rescued. She was on a voyage from Newcastle upon Tyne, Northumberland to "Trimlade".

=== 23 July ===
List of shipwrecks: 23 July 1770
Ship	State	Description
Cæsar	Great Britain	The ship was wrecked on the Lee Reef, off Port Morant, Jamaica. She was on a voyage from Jamaica to London.

=== Unknown date ===
List of shipwrecks: Unknown date 1770
Ship	State	Description
Jonge	Hamburg	The ship was driven ashore in the Elbe. She was on a voyage from Lisbon, Portugal to Hamburg.
Nancy	Great Britain	The ship was driven ashore at Wexford, Ireland. She was on a voyage from Africa to Liverpool, Lancashire.
Oriflama	Spain	The full-rigged ship foundered in the Pacific Ocean off the mouth of the Huenchullami River, Viceroyalty of Peru between 25 and 28 July after most of her crew had been killed by disease.

== August ==
=== Unknown date ===
List of shipwrecks: Unknown date 1770
Ship	State	Description
Gally	Great Britain	The ship foundered in the Dogger Bank. Her crew were rescued. She was on a voyage from Danzig and Königsburg, Prussia to Great Yarmouth, Norfolk.
Polly	Great Britain	The ship sank in the Dogger Bank. Her crew were rescued. She was on a voyage from Königsburg to .

== September ==
=== 6 September ===
List of shipwrecks: 6 September 1770
Ship	State	Description
Svyatoslav (Святослав)	Imperial Russian Navy	Russo-Turkish War: The Svyatoy Pavel-class ship of the line ran aground off Lemnos, Ottoman Greece and was wrecked. Her crew survived. She was burnt on 27 September to prevent capture by the Ottomans.

=== 15 September ===
List of shipwrecks: 15 September 1770
Ship	State	Description
Thomas	Great Britain	The ship was run down and sunk in the North Sea by a Dutch hoy. Her crew were rescued. She was on a voyage from Liverpool, Lancashire to Riga, Russia.

=== Unknown date ===
List of shipwrecks: Unknown date 1770
Ship	State	Description
Adventure	Great Britain	The ship was driven ashore in the Baltic Sea. She was on a voyage from Saint Petersburg, Russia to Venice.
Fortunate	Great Britain	The ship foundered in the Atlantic Ocean 20 leagues (60 nautical miles (110 km)) west of Cape Finisterre, Spain. Her crew were rescued. She was on a voyage from Dawpool, Cheshire to Venice.
Nossa Senhora do Carmo	Portugal	The ship was lost at Porto. She was on a voyage from London, Great Britain to Porto.
St. Paul	Great Britain	The ship ran aground off Union Stairs. She was on a voyage from Montserrat to London.

== October ==
=== 17 October ===
List of shipwrecks: 17 October 1770
Ship	State	Description
Amelia	British East India Company	The East Indiaman was destroyed by an explosion in the Ganges.

=== 28 October ===
List of shipwrecks: 28 October 1770
Ship	State	Description
Elizabeth	Great Britain	The ship departed from Newfoundland, British America for Porto, Portugal. No further trace, presumed foundered in the Atlantic Ocean with the loss of all hands.

=== Unknown date ===
List of shipwrecks: Unknown date 1770
Ship	State	Description
Agnes	Great Britain	The ship departed from Labrador, British America for London on 24 or 25 October. No further trace, presumed foundered in the Atlantic Ocean with the loss of all hands.
Albany	Great Britain	The ship was driven ashore on the Baltic coast of Sweden.
Ann	Great Britain	The ship was driven ashore at Rock, Cornwall.
Antigua	Great Britain	The brig foundered in the Atlantic Ocean off Crookhaven, County Cork, Ireland. She was on a voyage from Antigua to Liverpool, Lancashire.
Betsey	Great Britain	The ship foundered in the North Sea. Her crew were rescued by Hazard (Great Britain). Betsey was on a voyage from Norway to Hull, Yorkshire.
Brice	Great Britain	The ship was wrecked on the Haisborough Sands, in the North Sea off the coast of Norfolk. She was on a voyage from Saint Petersburg, Russia to Bristol, Gloucestershire.
Henry	Ireland	The ship struck a rock in the River Suir and was wrecked. She was on a voyage from Stockholm, Sweden to Waterford.
Mercury	Great Britain	The ship foundered in the Baltic Sea. She was on a voyage from Riga, Russia to London.

== November ==
=== 5 November ===
List of shipwrecks: 5 November 1770
Ship	State	Description
Elizabeth	Great Britain	The ship departed from Newfoundland. No further trace, presumed foundered with the loss of all hands.
Rodos (Родос, 'Rhodos')	Imperial Russian Navy	Russo-Turkish War: The ship of the line, a trophy captured in the Battle of Chesma, was intentionally beached in el:Mezapos Bay, Mani Peninsula, to avoid sinking from a heavy leak. She was on a voyage from Naousa, Paros to Port Mahon. The ship was burnt on 7 November to prevent re-capture by the Ottomans.

=== 10 November ===
List of shipwrecks: 10 November 1770
Ship	State	Description
Ruby	Ireland	The ship was wrecked at Ocracoke, North Carolina, British America. All on board were rescued. She was on a voyage from Cork to Ocracoke.

== December ==
=== 12 December ===
List of shipwrecks: 12 December 1770
Ship	State	Description
Greyhound	Great Britain	The ship was lost near Sligo, Ireland. She was on a voyage from Galway, Ireland to Whitby, Yorkshire.

=== 19 December ===
List of shipwrecks: 19 December 1770
Ship	State	Description
Le Port	France	The ship was wrecked on the "Island Galliot" with the loss of all but one of her crew. She was on a voyage from Porto, Portugal to London, Great Britain.
Providence	Great Britain	The ship is presumed to have foundered with the loss of all hands in the North Sea off Great Yarmouth, Norfolk. She was on a voyage from Sunderland, County Durham to Arundel, Sussex.

=== 27 December ===
List of shipwrecks: 27 December 1770
Ship	State	Description
Experiment	Great Britain	The ship was wrecked on the coast of Cuba. Her crew were rescued. She was on a voyage from Bristol, Gloucestershire to Virginia, British America and British Honduras.

=== Unknown date ===
List of shipwrecks: Unknown date 1770
Ship	State	Description
Albany	France	The ship was blown out to sea from the Île de France, Mauritius. No further trace, presumed foundered in the Indian Ocean with the loss of all hands.
Ann and Lydia	Great Britain	The ship foundered in St Brides Bay with the loss of all hands. She was on a voyage from Glasgow, Renfrewshire to Virginia, British America.
Copenhagen Paquet	Lübeck	The ship was lost near Falsterbo, Sweden.
David & Elizabeth	Great Britain	The ship was lost near Mahón, Balearic Islands, Spain with the loss of all on board. She was on a voyage from Genoa to Valencia, Spain.
Ellinor	Great Britain	The ship was driven ashore and wrecked on the coast of Suffolk. She was on a voyage from Memel, Prussia to London.
Eendraght	Hamburg	The ship ran aground near Hamburg. She was on a voyage from Hamburg to Bilbao.
Fertile	France	The ship was driven ashore and wrecked near La Rochelle with the loss of three or four of her crew. She was on a voyage from Dunkirk to Bordeaux and Saint-Domingue.
Hannah	Ireland	The ship was driven ashore and wrecked on Sanda Island, Argyllshire, Great Britain. She was on a voyage from Galway to Londonderry.
Hope & Speedwell	Ireland	The ship was driven ashore and wrecked at "Aberbock", Pembrokeshire. Her crew were rescued. She was on a voyage from Dublin to Bordeaux.
Lyon	Great Britain	The ship was driven ashore between Vila Nova de Gaia and Faro, Portugal. She was on a voyage from Bilbao to Cádiz, Spain.
Mansfield	Great Britain	The ship was driven ashore and wrecked near Dunstanburgh Castle, Northumberland with the loss of her captain. She was on a voyage from Gothenburg, Sweden to the Firth of Forth.
Prince of Wales	Ireland	The ship was driven ashore and wrecked in Strangford Lough, County Down. She was on a voyage from Belfast, County Antrim to Antigua.
Rachel	Great Britain	The ship was driven ashore and wrecked near Plymouth, Devon. Her crew were rescued. She was on a voyage from New England, British America to London.
Sally	Great Britain	The ship was driven ashore and wrecked on Öland, Sweden. She was on a voyage from Saint Petersburg and Narva, Russia to Glasgow, Renfrewshire.
Vine	Great Britain	The ship was driven ashore at Herne Bay, Kent. She was on a voyage from Málaga, Spain to London. Vine was refloated on 3 January 1771.
Wolfe	Great Britain	The ship was lost whilst on a voyage from Bilbao to Cádiz.

== Unknown date ==
List of shipwrecks: Unknown date 1770
Ship	State	Description
Alarm	Great Britain	The ship was lost at Senegal. She was on a voyage from British America to Senegal.
Ann	Great Britain	The ship foundered in the Bay of Honduras. She was on a voyage from London to Grenada, Barbados and British Honduras.
Argo	Great Britain	The East Indiaman was destroyed by fire at sea with the loss of most of her crew.
HMS Aurora	(Kingdom of Great Britain) Royal Navy	Lost in passage between the Cape of Good Hope and India; last seen on 24 December 1769 and assumed to have been wrecked in a storm in January 1770. Passengers included Henry Vansittart, a director of the East India Company and MP, and William Falconer, Scottish author of the poem The Shipwreck and compiler of a marine dictionary.
Boyne	Great Britain	The ship was driven ashore and wrecked on the coast of Maryland, British America.
Britannia	Great Britain	The ship was driven ashore and wrecked in the Bonny River, Africa.
Britannia	Great Britain	The ship was wrecked on the Colorados, off the coast of Cuba.
Charming Polly	Great Britain	The ship foundered in the Atlantic Ocean off Cape Hatteras, Florida, British America. She was on a voyage from London to North Carolina, British America.
Colonel Colecraft	Great Britain	The ship was lost near Trepassey, Newfoundland, British America.
Commerce	Great Britain	The ship was driven ashore and wrecked near the Capes of Philadelphia, British America. She was on a voyage from Hull, Yorkshire to New York
Dolphin	Great Britain	The ship foundered in the Atlantic Ocean. Her crew were rescued. She was on a voyage from South Carolina, British America to Cowes, Isle of Wight.
Edward	Great Britain	The ship was driven ashore and wrecked at Egg Harbour, New Jersey, British America. She was on a voyage from London to New York, British America.
Expedition	Great Britain	African slave trade: The sloop was discovered at sea crewless by Giegson of the River (Great Britain). Her 110 slaves were taken on board and Expedition was sunk. She was on a voyage from Senegal to the West Indies.
Fly	Great Britain	The ship was wrecked on the coast of Gold Coast, Africa.
Generous Friends	(Kingdom of Great Britain) British America	The ship ran aground in the Delaware River and was severely damaged. She was refloated after nine days and taken in to New York for repairs. She was on a voyage from Antigua to Philadelphia, Pennsylvania.
George	Great Britain	The ship was wrecked in the Little Fogo Islands, Newfoundland, British America with the loss of four of her crew. She was on a voyage from Poole, Dorset to Fogo, Newfoundland.
Gorel	Great Britain	The ship was driven ashore and wrecked 3 leagues (9 nautical miles (17 km)) north of Cape Charles, Virginia, British America.
Hungerford	Great Britain	The ship was driven ashore and wrecked in the River Bonny.
Industry	(Kingdom of Great Britain) British America	The sloop was driven ashore and wrecked at Kennebunk, Maine in the autumn of 1770 with the loss of all hands. She was on her maiden voyage.
King of Prussia	Great Britain	The ship foundered in the Atlantic Ocean. Her crew were rescued by Hopewell (Great Britain). King of Prussia was on a voyage from Africa to Jamaica and London.
Liberty	Great Britain	The ship was lost at Bonny, Nigeria.
Matty	Great Britain	The ship ran aground off "Zignera" and was wrecked.
Polly & Nancy	Great Britain	The ship foundered in the Atlantic Ocean. She was on a voyage from Lisbon, Portugal to Philadelphia.
Meeda	France	The ship was lost near Cape Francis. She was on a voyage from Saint-Domingue to Bordeaux.
Pascal Paoli	Great Britain	The ship was driven ashore between the Ossabaw Islands and St. Catharines, Georgia, British America. She was on a voyage from Jamaica to Milford, Pembrokeshire.
Providence	Great Britain	The ship foundered in the Adriatic Sea off Venice. She was on a voyage from London to Venice.
Serjeant Glynn	Great Britain	The ship foundered off the coast of South Carolina. Her crew were rescued by Sukey (Great Britain). Serjeant Glynn was on a voyage from London to North Carolina.
St. Mary	Great Britain	The ship foundered in the Gulf of Florida. She was on a voyage from Jamaica to London.
