= Anaa =

Atoll in French Polynesia

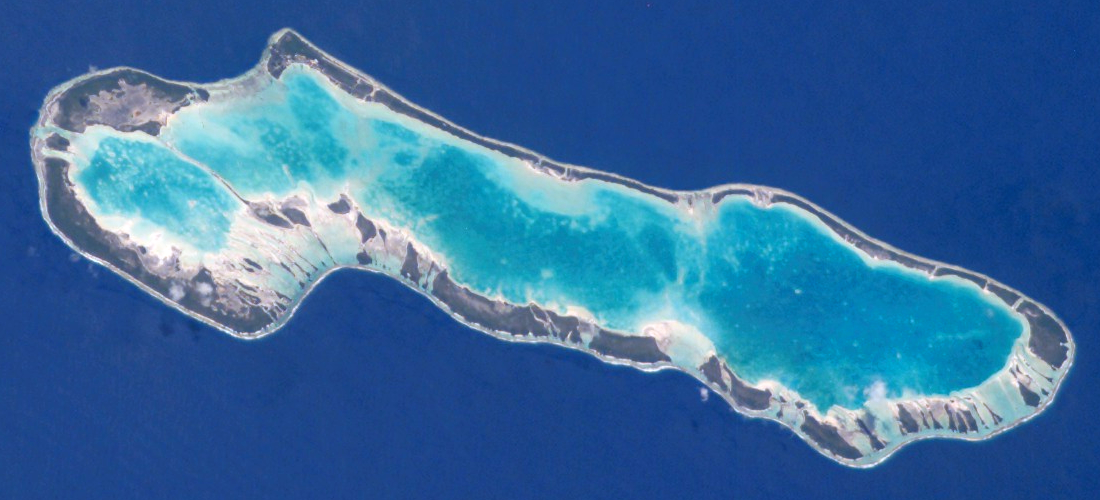
- NASA picture of Anaa Atoll

- Location within French Polynesia

Geography
- Location: Pacific Ocean
- Coordinates: 17°20′31″S 145°30′31″W
- Archipelago: Tuamotus
- Area: 90 km^{2} (35 sq mi)(lagoon); 38 km^{2} (15 sq mi) (above water)
- Length: 29.5 km (18.33 mi)
- Width: 6.5 km (4.04 mi)
- Highest elevation: 11 m (36 ft)
- Highest point: (unnamed)

Administration
- France
- Overseas collectivity: French Polynesia
- Administrative subdivision: Îles Tuamotu-Gambier
- Commune: Anaa
- Largest settlement: Tuuhora

Demographics
- Population: 530 (2022)
- Pop. density: 14/km^{2} (36/sq mi)

Anaa, Nganaa-nui (or Ara-ura) is an atoll in the Tuamotu archipelago, in French Polynesia. It is located in the north-west of the archipelago, 350 km to the east of Tahiti. It is oval in shape, 29.5 km in length and 6.5 km wide, with a total land area of 38 km^{2} and a population of 504. The atoll is made up by eleven small barren islands with deeper and more fertile soil than other atolls in the Tuamotus. The lagoon is shallow, without entrance, and formed by three main basins. Although it does not have any navigable access, the water of the lagoon renews by several small channels that can be crossed walking.

== History ==
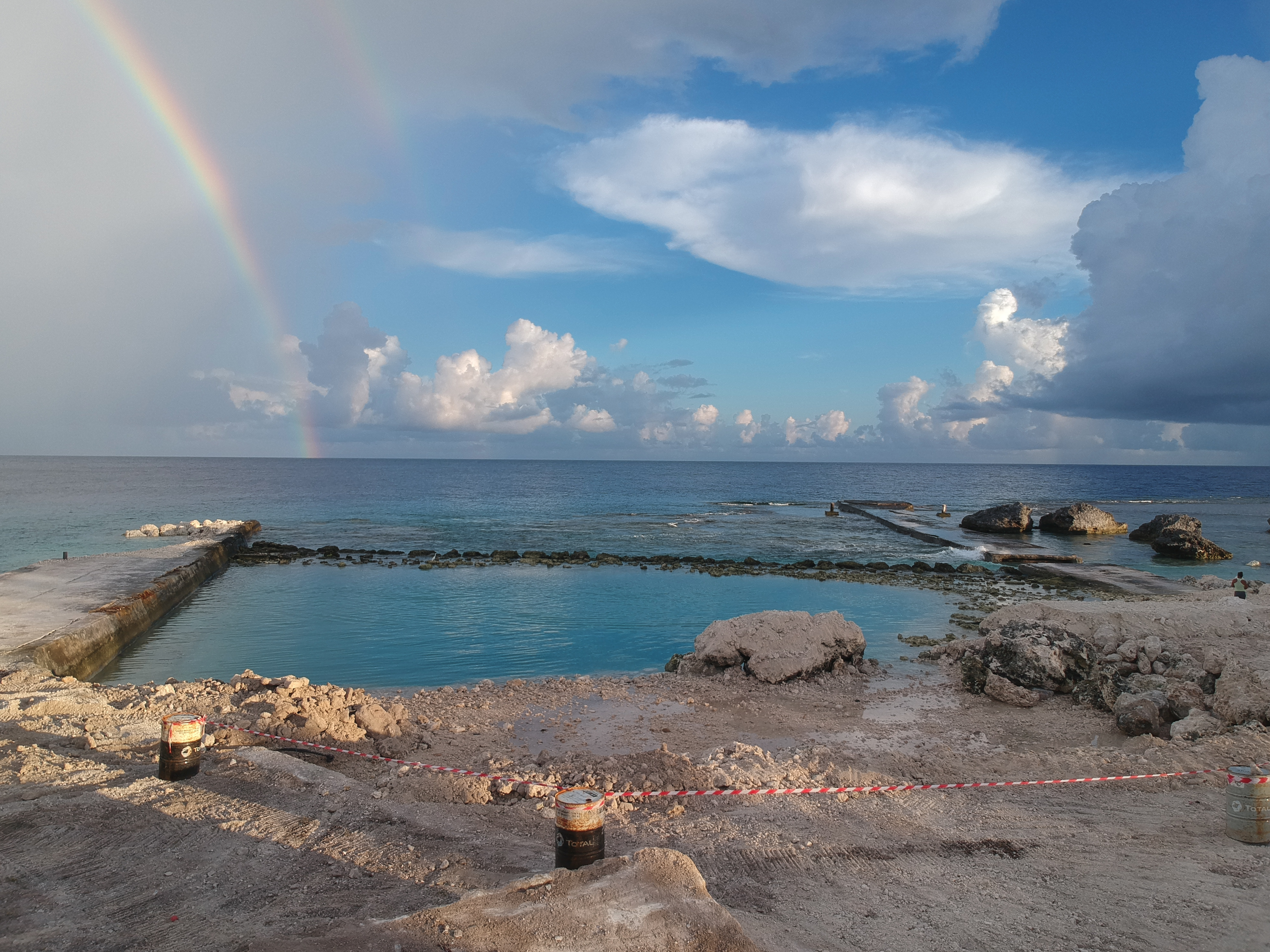
Landscape

The atoll of Anaa was known by the legendary cruelty of its soldiers who in the seventeenth century, dominated the north-west of the Tuamotus.

The Spanish expedition of Pedro Fernández de Quirós landed on Conversión de San Pablo on 10 February 1606, since identified as either Anaa or Hao. The sighting of Anaa was recorded by French explorer Louis Antoine de Bougainville in 1768. James Cook sighted it in 1769. Because of its shape, he called it Chain Island. Later, Anaa was visited by Spanish explorer Domingo de Bonechea, on November 1 of 1772, who called it Isla de Todos los Santos (All Saints Island) because they arrived on All Saints' Day.

At the beginning of the nineteenth century, control of the atoll went to the Pomaré of Tahiti. Around 1850 Anaa was an active center of the nacre commerce and copra, with a maximum population of 2,000. The missionary competition between Mormons of North America and French Catholics led to a revolt in 1852, and an intervention by French colonial troops.

In 1878 and 1906 Anaa suffered severe hurricane damages and was completely flooded. After the hurricane of 1983, the only village was moved and reconstructed, incorporating a refuge shelter with capacity for all its population.

Anaa has a territorial airport which was inaugurated in 1976.

== Geography ==
Anaa is located 66 km south of Faaite Atoll, 78 km from Tahanea Atoll and 377 km east of Tahiti; and is an oval atoll 29.5 km long and 6.5 km wide, with a total area of 38 km^{2}. The coral reef is made up of eleven islets with deeper and more fertile soil than the other atolls of the Tuamotu, of which nine are named:

Kereteki, Mania, Omanaotika, Oparari, Otepipi, Putuahara, Teharie, Tematahoa and Tukuhora.

The lagoon is shallow, with no navigable passages to the ocean, and consists of 3 main basins. Although it has no navigable passages, the lagoon water is renewed by several shallow channels that can be crossed on foot.

=== Geology ===
Geologically, the atoll is the coral outgrowth (105 meters) of the top of a large volcanic seamount of the same name (the "Anaa Ridge", 11,438 m3), measuring 3,415 meters from the seafloor, formed some 52.5-59.6 million years ago.

=== Fauna and flora ===
The atoll is home to an endemic population of long-billed warblers and its lagoon has colonies of Cardium fragum.

=== Tuuhora ===
The main village is Tuuhora, also called Tukuhora or Anaa, with a population of about 350. The other small villages like Temarie, Otepipi, Mania and Tematahoa have small seasonal population. The population subsists mainly on fishing, the cultivation of nacre and the production of copra.

== Demography ==
The population was 530 in 2022, and lives mainly from fishing, mother-of-pearl farming and copra production.

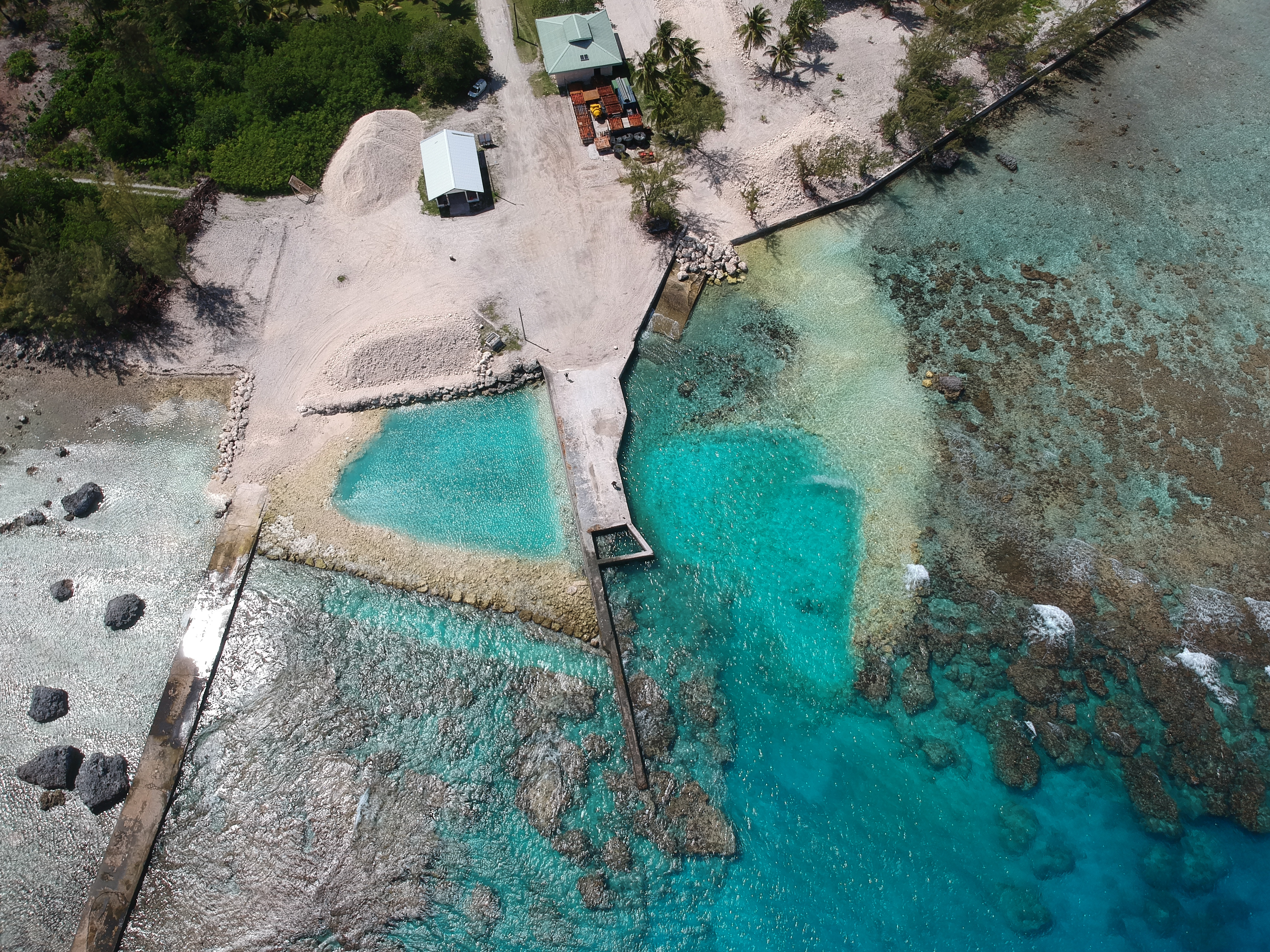
Pier at the Atoll

In 2017, the total population of Anaa was 494 people and its evolution is as follows:

1983	1988	1996	2002	2007	2012	2017	2022
400	426	411	435	463	496	494	530
Sources: ISPF and Government of French Polynesia.

=== Religion ===
In 1850, Anaa was an active mother-of-pearl and copra trading centre, with a maximum population of 2000 people. In 1852, French colonial troops intervened, following an uprising resulting from competition between North American Mormons and French Catholics. Today, most of the population is affiliated with Christianity. The Catholic Church owns a religious building on the atoll (on Tukuhora) called St. Joseph's Church (Église de Saint-Joseph) which is under the Metropolitan Archdiocese of Papeete based in Tahiti.

== Economy ==
Most of the atoll's economic activity is related to fishing and fish farming, as well as copra production, with coconut plantations cultivated on virtually every motus (islets).

Anaa has an airfield (IATA code: AAA) near the main town of Tukuhora with a runway 1,400 meters long. On average, it handles about 140 flights and 3,500 passengers per year.

== Commune of Anaa ==
Anaa
- Commune
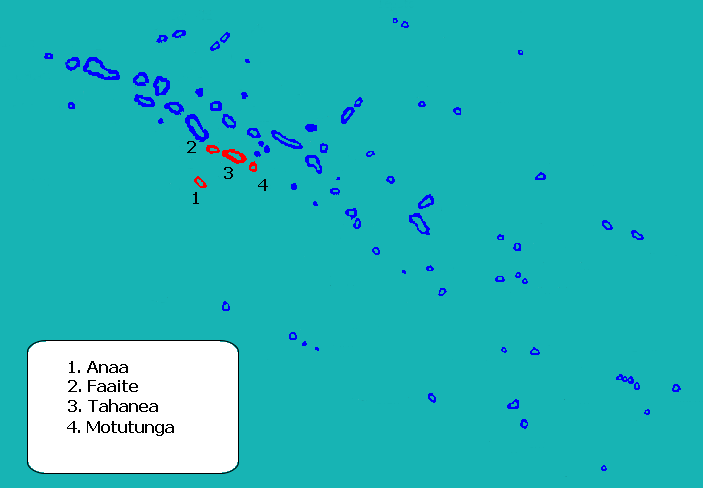
- Location (in red) within the Tuamotu Archipelago
- Location of Anaa
- Coordinates: 17°20′31″S 145°30′31″W
- Country: France
- Overseas collectivity: French Polynesia
- Subdivision: Îles Tuamotu-Gambier
- Area^{1}: 55.7 km^{2} (21.5 sq mi)
- Population (2022): 970
  - Density: 17/km^{2} (45/sq mi)
- Time zone: UTC−10:00
- INSEE/Postal code: 98711 /
- ^{1} French Land Register data, which excludes lakes, ponds, glaciers > 1 km^{2} (0.386 sq mi or 247 acres) and river estuaries.

The atoll Anaa is part of the commune (municipality) Anaa, that is part of the administrative subdivision of the Îles Tuamotu-Gambier. This commune also includes the associated atoll of Faaite and the uninhabited atolls of Tahanea and Motutunga. The seat of the commune is the village Tuuhora.

=== Overview ===
Atoll	main village	Population 2022	land area (km^{2})	lagoon (km^{2})	Location
commune associée of Anaa
Anaa	Tuuhora	530	37.7	90	17°20′S 145°30′W
commune associée of Faaite
Faaite	Hitianau	440	18.0	227	16°43′S 145°19′W
Motutunga	-	-	18.0	126	17°04′S 144°17′W
Tahanea	-	-	18.0	522.5	16°50′S 144°45′W
commune of Anaa	Tukuhora	970	55.7	965.5	

=== Faaite ===
Faaite is an atoll located 60 km to the north of Anaa. The total surface of the atoll is of 230 km^{2}. Its dry land area has a surface of 9 km^{2}. The inner lagoon has a navigable channel to the ocean. The main village is Hitianau, with a total population of 246. It was discovered by John Turnbull in 1802, the first retailer of the Pacific who used the route of Tahiti to Hawaii. Historically the atoll also has been known as Miloradovich.

=== Tahanea ===
Tahanea is an atoll of 63 km^{2}, with three passages towards the interior of the lagoon. It is uninhabited and is visited occasionally. It was discovered by Domingo Bonaechea in 1772, who called it San Julian. It has also been known as Tchitschagof.

=== Motutunga ===
Motutunga is an uninhabited atoll, with a passage to the interior of the nonnavigable lagoon. Domingo Bonaechea called it San Blas. It has also been known as Adventure Island.
