= Motutunga =

Atoll in French Polynesia

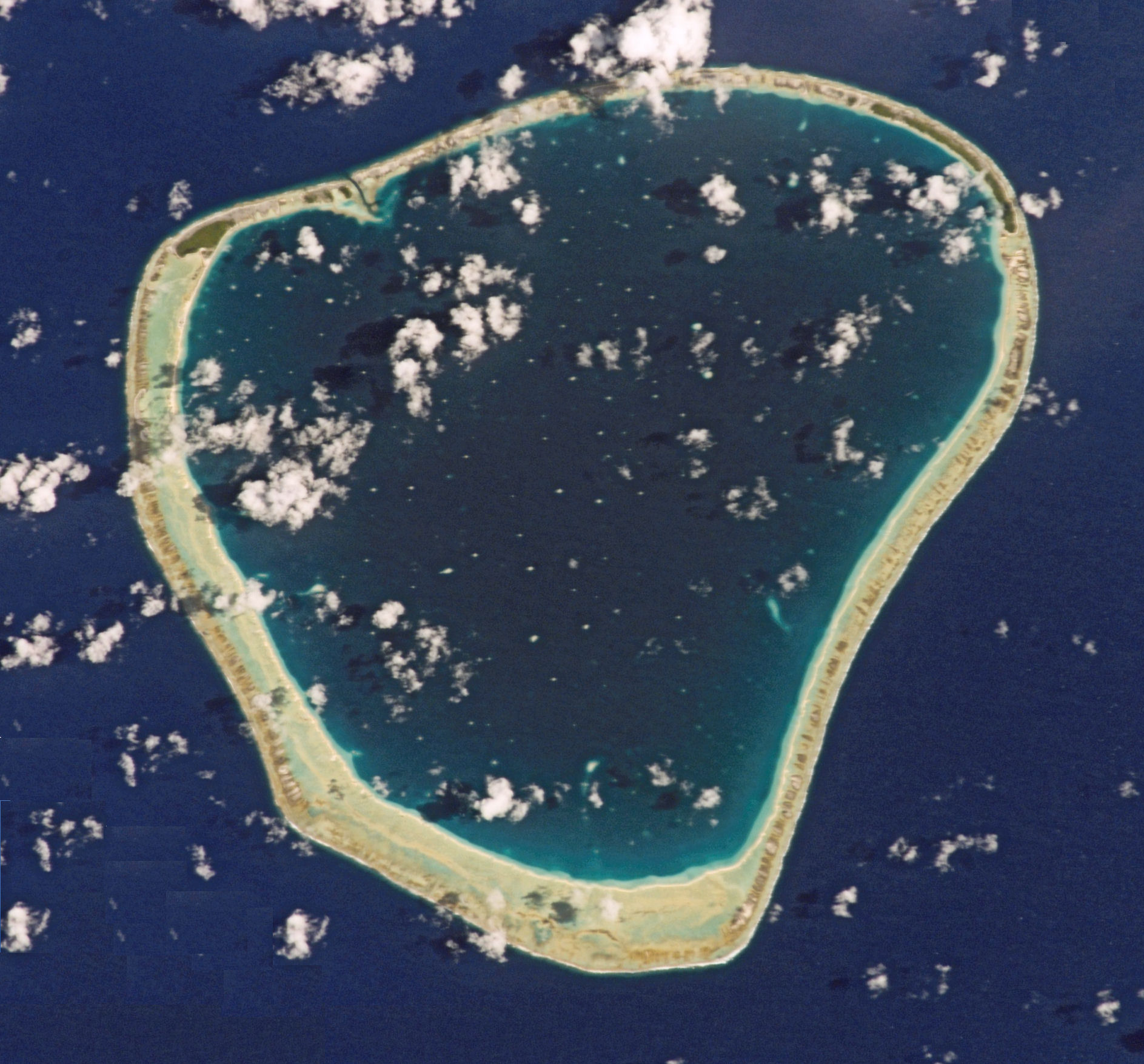
- NASA picture of Motutunga Atoll

- Location within French Polynesia

Geography
- Location: Pacific Ocean
- Coordinates: 17°04′S 144°17′W
- Archipelago: Tuamotus
- Area: 126 km^{2} (49 sq mi) (lagoon); 2.5 km^{2} (0.97 sq mi) (above water)
- Length: 15 km (9.3 mi)
- Width: 14 km (8.7 mi)

Administration
- France
- Overseas collectivity: French Polynesia
- Administrative subdivision: Tuamotus
- Commune: Anaa

Demographics
- Population: Uninhabited (2012)

Motutunga Atoll is an uninhabited atoll of the Tuamotu Archipelago in French Polynesia. It is located 17 km to the east of Tahanea Atoll.

Motutunga Atoll is roughly triangular in shape. It measures 15 km in length with a maximum width of 14 km. The reef surrounding the atoll is continuous, leaving no channels deep enough for ships to reach the lagoon. Motutunga's lagoon has a surface of 126 km^{2}.

== History ==
Motutunga Atoll was first sighted by James Cook on 13 August 1773 who named it Adventure, after the name of his own ship.

Spanish navigator Domingo de Boenechea sighted the atoll, which he called San Blas, on 9 November 1774 from ship Aguila.

== Administration ==
Motutunga belongs to the commune of Anaa that also includes the associated commune of Faaite with the atoll of Faaite and the uninhabited atolls of Tahanea and Motutunga.

== See also ==
- Desert island
- List of islands
