= Anaa Airport =

Anaa Airport Aérodrome d'Anaa
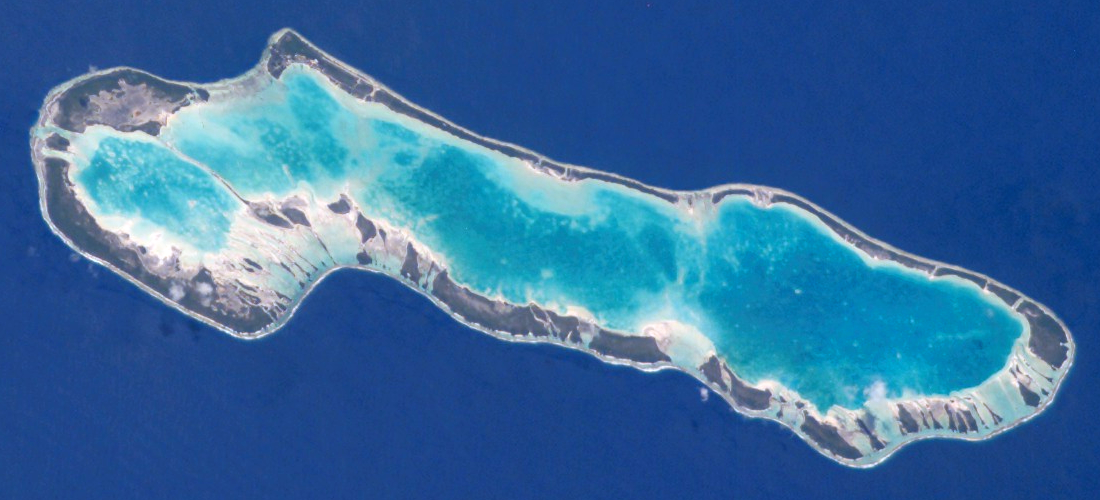
- NASA picture of Anaa Atoll
- IATA: AAA; ICAO: NTGA

Summary
- Airport type: Public
- Operator: DSEAC Polynésie Française
- Serves: Anaa
- Location: Tukuhora, French Polynesia
- Elevation AMSL: 10 ft / 3 m
- Coordinates: 17°21′8.7″S 145°30′36.2″W

Map
- Location of the airport in French Polynesia

Runways
Direction	Length		Surface
Direction	m	ft	Surface
14L/32R	1,502	4,928	Asphalt

Statistics (2021)
- Passengers: 3,797
- Aircraft Movements: 120
- Cargo (metric tons): 14
- Sources: DAFIF, French AIP.

Anaa Airport (IATA: AAA, ICAO: NTGA) is an airport serving Anaa, an atoll in the Tuamotu archipelago in French Polynesia. It is located 2 kilometres (1.2 mi) southeast of the village of Tukuhora. The airport type is medium and the World Area Code is 823. The nearest airport (76.22 km) is Faaite Airport. The airport is recorded to be 3m above sea level and contains a runway of length 1500m.

== Airlines and destinations ==
=== Passenger ===
Air Tahiti serves Faa’a International Airport and Faaite Airport from Anaa Airport.

== See also ==
- List of airports in French Polynesia
