= Domingo de Bonechea =

Spanish Navy officer and explorer

Domingo Bernardo de Bonechea Andonaegui (21 September 1713 – 26 January 1775) was a Spanish Navy officer and explorer. He is known for having tried to incorporate Tahiti into the Spanish Empire. De Bonechea's exploratory voyages were commissioned by the viceroy of Peru, Manuel de Amat y Junyent, who was concerned that James Cook's explorations might lead to the creation of British bases from which to attack Peru. De Bonechea reached Tahiti only weeks after the first voyage of James Cook, and indeed found an axe left there by Cook's expedition. He recorded a great many local native words.

== Early life and family ==
Domingo Bernardo de Bonechea Andonaegui was born 21 September 1713 in Getaria, Gipuzkoa, Spain. His father, Juan Bauptista de Bonechea Aramburu (1685–1770), son of Geronimo Boneachea and Mariana Aramburu, commanded the fishing vessel Terranova off Nova Scotia in 1727 became a captain in the Spanish Royal Navy, and was Alcalde (mayor) of Getaria in 1756; his uncle Francisco de Bonechea Aramburu was a frigate captain. His mother was Francisca Andonaegui Narbasta; the parents married on 25 March 1714, a few months after Domingo's birth. His younger brother Francisco Bonechea Andonaegui was also a naval officer, mentioned as a lieutenant aboard one of the frigates that escorted Carlos III from Italy to Spain in 1759 on his accession to the Spanish throne and died in Puerto Caballo in 1761. He was a third cousin once removed of the explorer Manuel Facundo Agote Bonechea 1755-1803), with whom he corresponded.

Domingo de Bonechea Andonaegui did not pass through naval college or formal navigational studies. He served in the Spanish navy as a pilot from 1732 to 1740, when he became midshipman (Alferez) of a frigate. He took part in the Battle of Toulon (22/23 February 1744) He was promoted to Midshipman of a Ship of the Line in 1749 and to Frigate lieutenant in 1751.

In 1754 he was promoted to lieutenant of a ship of the line. His first command seems to have been the Corvette Maite (18)in which he took part in the action in which Spain lost Havana to the British Admiral Pocock in 1762. After a desperate action on June 28 against the British Captain George Mackenzie he surrendered at Mariel together with the Virganza (24) commanded by Diego Argote. He was exonerated of all blame and acquitted with honour.

In 1766 he became a frigate captain and from 1767 commanded the frigate Santa Maria Magdalena, afterwards renamed Aguila. Together with the Lievre, he took supplies to the Falkland Islands and reached the port of Concepcion (Chile) on 14 April 1768. From there he continued on to Callao (Peru) and seems to have remained in the region for several years.

== First voyage (1772–1773) ==
On September 26, 1772, de Bonechea went on an exploratory expedition to Tahiti. He sailed with Tomás Gayangos as his lieutenant on the Aguila, Santa Maria Magdalena, from Callao harbour, Peru, and reached Tahiti on 7 Nov. He anchored in Vaiuru's Bay, which de Bonechea christened "Puerto Santa Maria Magdalena". De Bonechea forbade himself and his crew any sexual relations with local women, which surprised the Tahitians greatly. He left Tahiti on December 20 and reached Valparaíso on February 21, 1773.

Georg Forster, who accompanied Cook on his Second Voyage, refers to him as "Domingo Buenechea".

== Second Voyage (1774–1775) ==
The aim of this expedition was the annexation of Tahiti to the Spanish crown, with the approval and encouragement of King Carlos III, and to convert its inhabitants. Two ships, the Aguila and the Jupiter left Callao on September 20, 1774. Bonechea and Tu decided a place within 150 yards of the Vaitepiha River, in Vaitepiha Bay, was the best place for a mission. This area is now known as Tautira Bay, but referred to by the Spanish as 'La Santissima Cruz de Ohatutira'.

However, de Bonechea died on 26 January 1775, in Tahiti, and buried near the Holy Cross marking Spain's dominion over the island, near the mission house. The mission was abandoned on 12 November, however.

The cross, with the inscription Christus Vincit Carolus III imperat 1774, was taken down by the British in 1777.

His grave was rediscovered in the 20th century in the village of Tautira.

== See also ==
- Buenechea Regarding his family name.
- Tahanea & Tatakoto, two atolls visited by Domingo de Bonechea before any other recorded European mariner.
