= Tautira Bay =

Bay in Tahiti, French Polynesia

Coordinates: 17.75°S 149.17°W

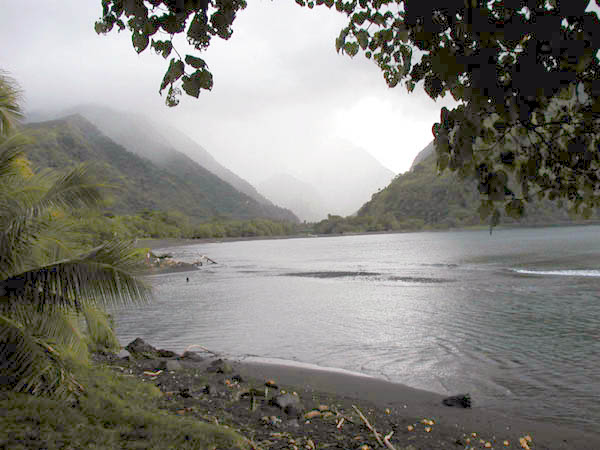
Tautira Bay

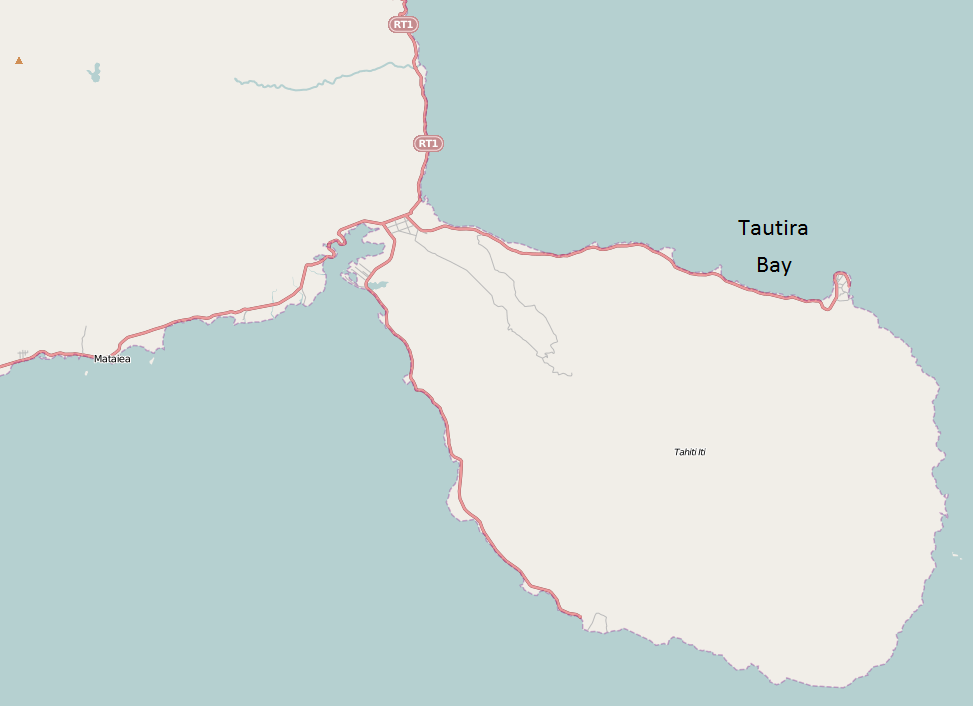
Tautira Bay

Tautira Bay (alternate: Cooks Anchorage) (lat 17°45' S, long. 149° 10' W) is located on the island of Tahiti in French Polynesia. It is part of the commune Taiarapu-Est. It is formed by Tautira Point and reef on the eastern side, and by the barrier reef on the western side. It is reached through a gap in the reef about half a mile wide, with deep water, with Tautira point giving it protection from winds from north-east. It is 0.5 miles (0.80 km) wide and about the same depth. The bay opens to the northwest, affording protection with winds from northeastward through east and south to west-northwestward, but can be dangerous with those between north and west-northwestward. James Cook anchored several times in this bay, from which circumstance the name is derived. The depth in the middle of the entrance is from 35 to 60 fathoms, diminishing gradually to the shore. The bay is clear, except a small patch of 2 fathoms 600 feet (180 m) southward of the point of reef on the western side. The eastern and southeastern shore is lined with a sandy beach. The best anchorage is at about 1,200 feet (370 m) from the shore in 8.5 fathoms, sand, with the extreme of Tautira Point bearing 45°.

The harbor in Tautira Bay is Te-'afa ("the crack"). Port Pihaa is the deep basin, from 1,800–2,400 feet (550–730 m) wide and 1.5 miles (2.4 km) long, between the barrier reef and the shore, extending from Tautira Bay to Pihaa Point, with depths nearly everywhere of from 16 to 19 fathoms, sand and mud. There are two openings into this port, that from the eastward from Tautira Bay being 600 feet (180 m) wide, but divided by a small 2-fathom patch; the other from the westward, from Taharoa Pass, is only about 60 yards wide.

== See also ==
- Vaitepiha River
