= Tamborrada =

Celebratory drum festival held every year in San Sebastián, Spain

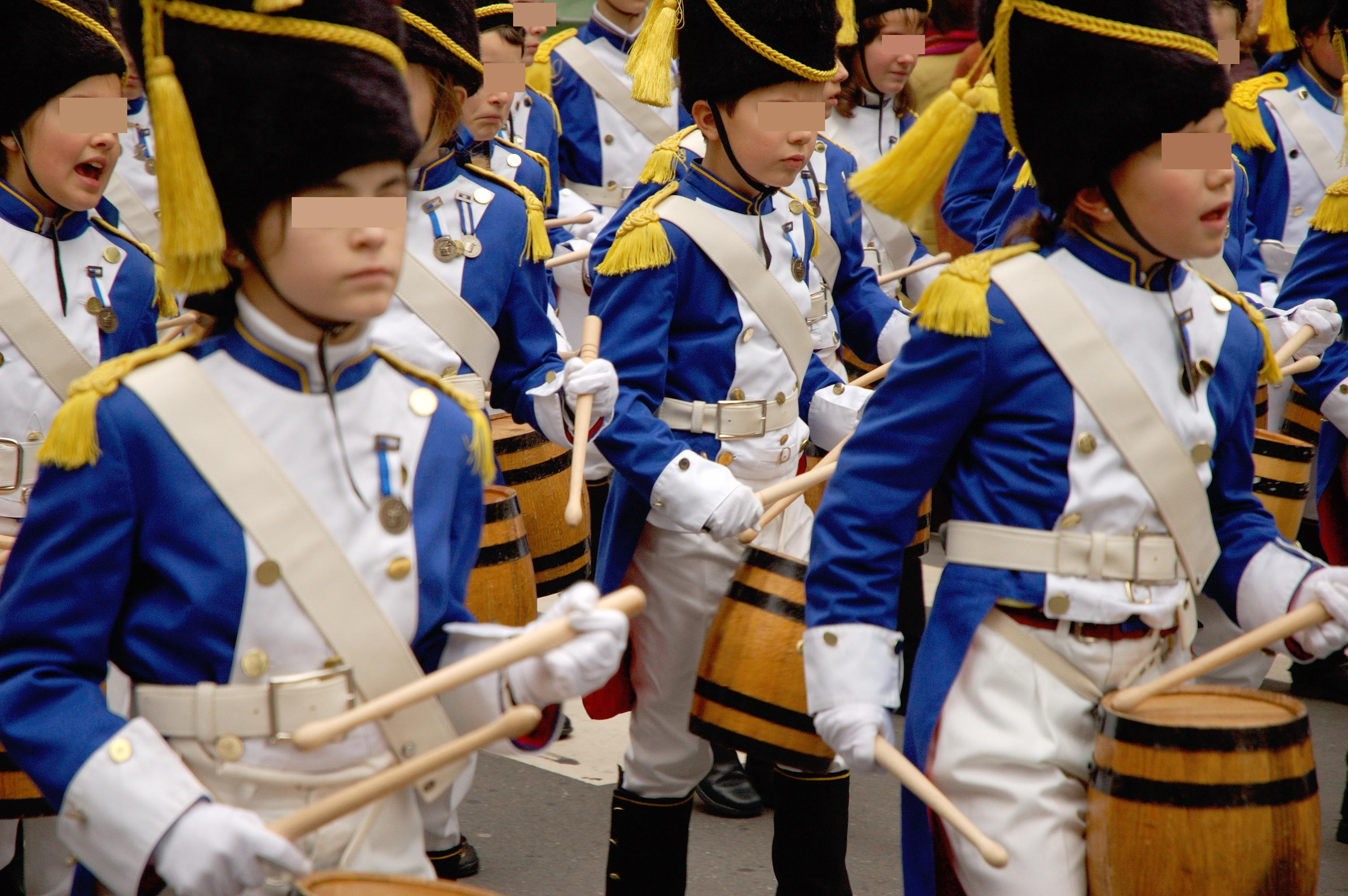
Tamborrada, kids section

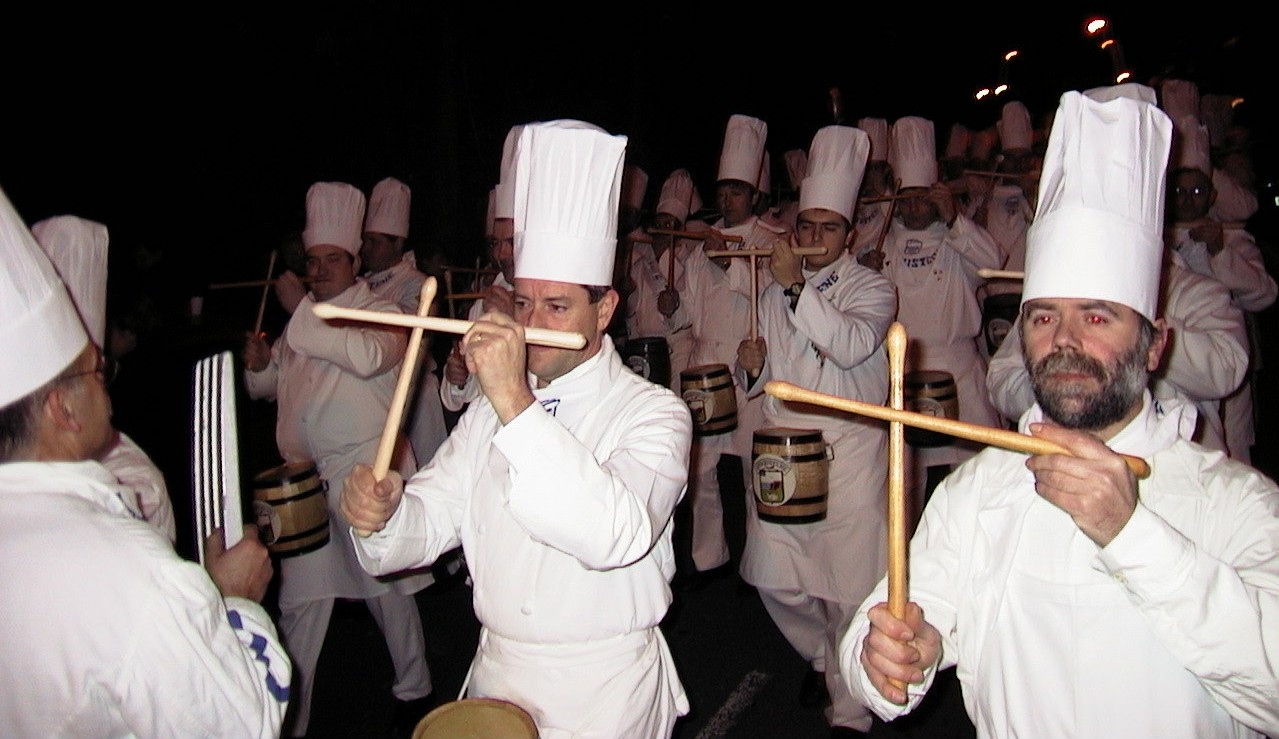
Tamborrada in San Sebastián

Tamborrada of Donostia (Basque: Donostiako Danborrada) is a celebratory drum festival held every year on January 20 in the city of San Sebastián, Spain. At midnight, in the Konstituzio Plaza in the "Alde Zaharra/Parte Vieja" (Old Town), the mayor raises the flag of San Sebastián. The festival lasts for 24 hours. Participants, dressed as cooks and soldiers, march in companies across the city. The celebration ends at midnight, when people congregate at the Konstituzio Plaza and the city flag is simultaneously lowered at various locations.

== Origin and development ==
During the 19th century, as a walled military stronghold, the city of San Sebastián was subject to heavy property damage due to military activity, sometimes with dire consequences. This was especially true during the Siege of San Sebastián (1813), in which international powers (Spain, France, Great Britain, and Portugal) were involved. The war caused between 7,000 and 50,000 casualties.

The festival is said to originate from the 1830s custom of locals using buckets and hardware from the water pump to mock the soldiers stationed in the city by aping their daily procession from the San Telmo headquarters to the Main Gate at the city walls (Puerta de Tierra). The comic procession in carnival mood may have developed into a prelude for the Carnival of Donostia, which started on 20 January, followed by the Caldereros at the beginning of February.

In the early days, the procession also heralded the ox run event, held on the same day. At this stage, the members of the procession dressed in everyday clothes, as they had not adopted uniforms yet. The procession further developed when local tradesman Vicente "Txiki" Buenechea donated barrels to be used as drums. In 1881, unused military outfits were discovered in the San Telmo headquarters. These were donated to the council, which in turn gave them to the Unión Artesana club (the oldest in existence) for use in the Tamborrada. By 1886, barrels were added to the formations in attendance. Other sociedades gastronómicas ("gourmet clubs") joined the Union Artesana in following years, thus expanding the festival attendance.

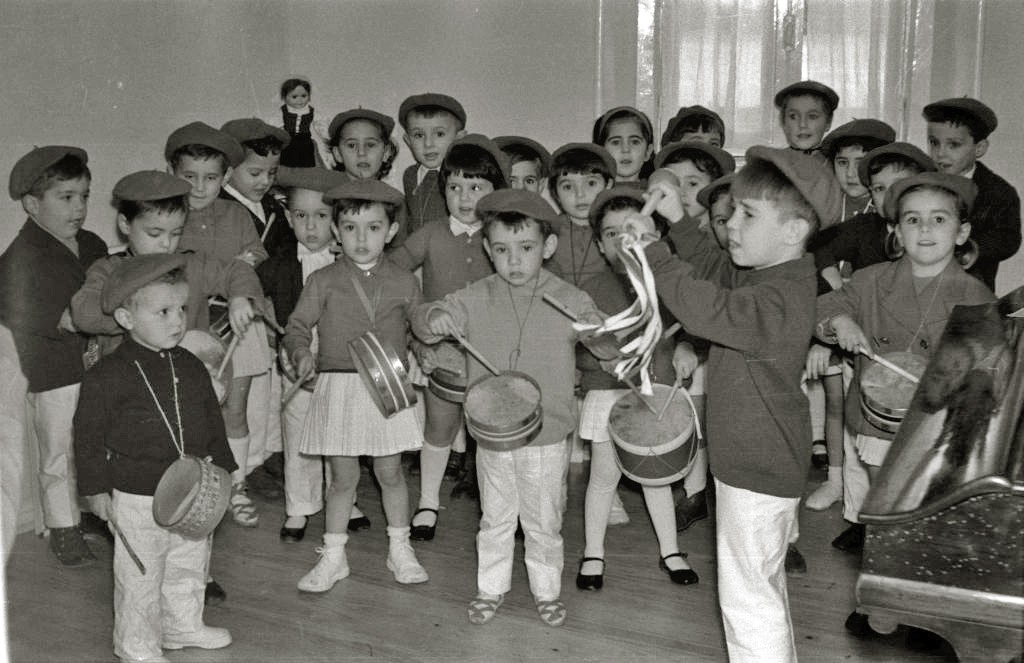
Children's tamborrada practice in 1962

According to an urban legend, a baker was fetching water from a fountain during a drought in San Sebastián in 1720. As he began to sing, local women around him started pounding on their water basins to accompany him. To his surprise, the water kept on flowing and they kept on drumming with glee. Soon a crowd gathered. As the legend has it, there has not been a drought ever since, nor has the music of the barrels ever stopped playing.

The event was cancelled in 1902 and was revived in 1906, but remained the same way even up to the years of Francisco Franco's dictatorship, which banned Carnival statewide, but maintained the two iconic festivals of the city, the Tamborrada and the Caldereros. To ensure the continuity of the city's traditions the first Children's Tamborrada was held in 1927, and has now become a permanent part of the festivities since 1961. From just only 3 in the 1920s, today there are over 125 clubs and organizations that have formations for the event. Since 1980, the Tamborrada ensembles are generally mixed gender formations.

== Music ==
In 1861, local musician Raimundo Sarriegui composed the occasion's iconic marches, including the "March of San Sebastian", which caught on and gained popularity. Other works of his include "Erretreta", "Tatiago", "Diana" and "Iriyarena." Additional pieces have been added more recently. The traditional lyrics sung to the marches were composed by local writer Serafin Baroja.

The old city march, composed by José Juan Santesteban, was added to the official songlist in 2013, marking the bicentennial year since the historic siege of 1813. The Old March was played in the 1830s as part of the festivities during those times.

== Current celebration ==
Adults usually have dinner in sociedades gastronómicas ("gourmet clubs"), which provide elements of the procession, and traditionally admitted only males. Even the strictest ones now allow women on the "Noche de la Tamborrada." They eat sophisticated meals, mostly composed of seafood (traditionally elver, now no longer served due to its exorbitant price) and drink the best wines.

Depending on the time the company is marching, parade-goers take to the streets and are sometimes offered drinks between the musical performances. Nowadays, the Tamborrada is made up of mixed-sex companies for the most part, while proportions may vary a lot from one to the other. For "Donostiarras," this is the most celebrated festival of the year. These drummer groups often have marching bands playing along with them.

After hearing drums all night, children wake up with a version of the Tamborrada for children. They dress traditionally as soldiers from Napoleonic times and march around the city. Children from all the schools of San Sebastián march that day. They wear costumes that usually represent a particular country (such as England, Germany, or Romania). More recently, the parade has been pushed back to days before the festival proper; thus, the Children's Tamborrada is the first activity of the festival. 2024 marks the 63rd anniversary of the Children's Tamborrada, which launched in 1961 to promote the cultural legacy of the festival to the younger generations. A repeat performance is held at noon on the festival day. Fifty-two contingents from schools in the city join the celebrations beating their snare drums while honoring the heroes of the defense of the city and its patron.

== Formation ==
Each of the contingents are formed by and sponsored by traditionally the txokos, and today by a variety of organizations sanctioned by the city council to form delegations for the festival. These also send liaisons to coordinate with a city council representative on the route of the march and on what district/s and/or borough/s of the city they will have to hold their festivities for the year.

Most of these are of company size save for one - the Peña Anastasio association - with 400 men and women, the size of a small battalion, and split into 3 formations. It is also affiliated with the local football team in the area.

Each for the formations are composed of:

- Markers
- Color guard
- Cantineras
- Drum major
- Drum section, using snare drums
- Marching band
- Barrel drum section

Formed in 1934, the Gaztelubide association's contingent serves as the official band for the opening ceremony while the band of the Union Artesana association closes the celebrations. By 2015-16 and 2023 the former was joined by the Coro Easo in singing the San Sebastian March.

== Overseas commemorations ==
Given San Sebastián's status as one of the two cities chosen to be the European Capital of Culture for 2016, it is no surprise, however, that Wrocław, Poland, the other ECC city, has begun celebrating the festival as well in 2015 – as the Wrocław Tamborrada. The 2016 event even had Polish Armed Forces bands in attendance. Just like in San Sebastián, children also take part in the event as well.
