= Tahanea =

Atoll in French Polynesia

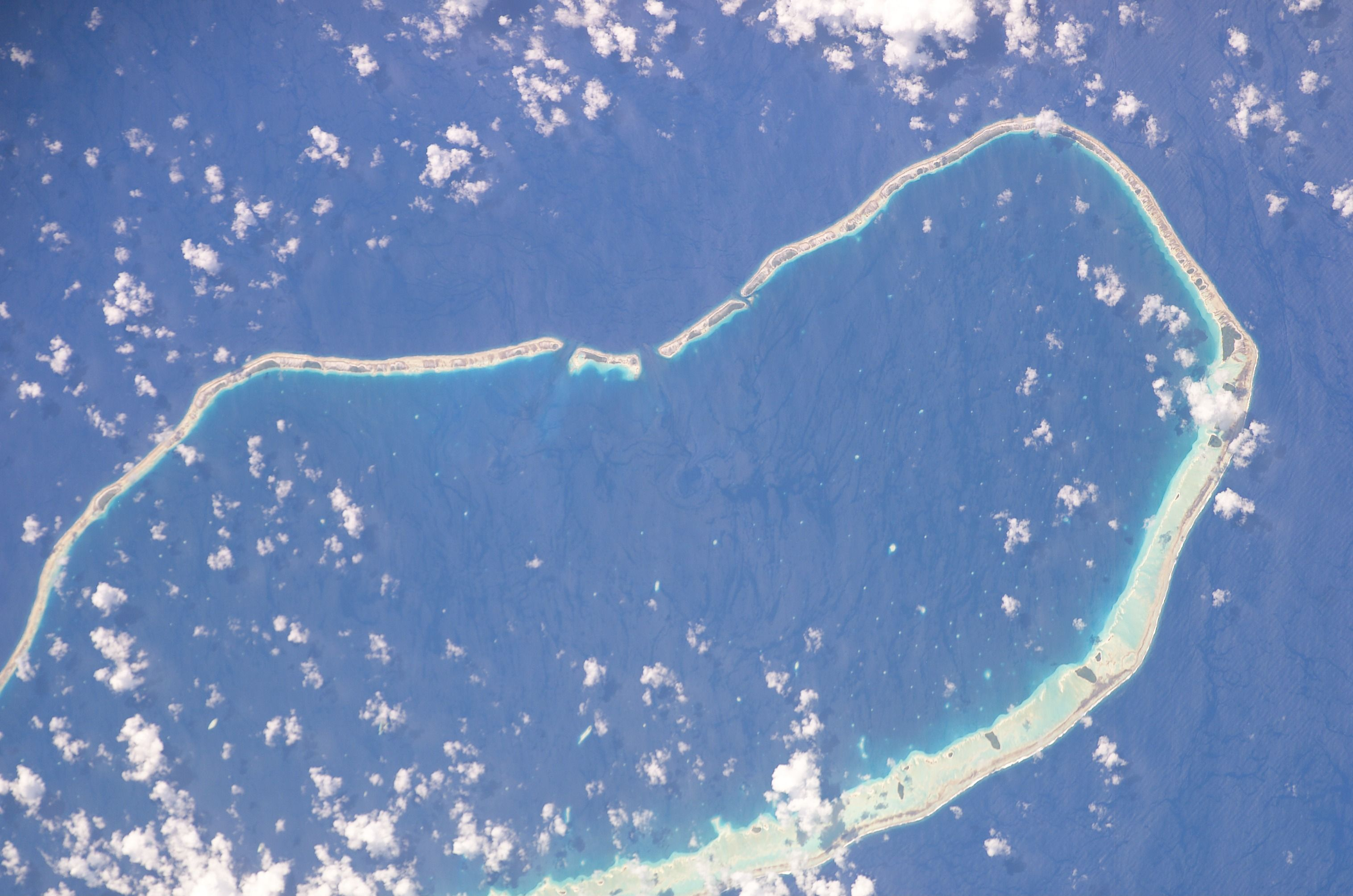
- NASA picture of Tahanea Atoll

- Location within French Polynesia

Geography
- Location: Pacific Ocean
- Coordinates: 16°50′S 144°45′W
- Archipelago: Tuamotus
- Area: 522.5 km^{2} (201.7 sq mi) (lagoon); 9.5 km^{2} (3.7 sq mi) (above water)
- Length: 48 km (29.8 mi)
- Width: 15.2 km (9.44 mi)

Administration
- France
- Overseas collectivity: French Polynesia
- Administrative subdivision: Tuamotus
- Commune: Anaa

Demographics
- Population: Uninhabited (2012)

Tahanea Atoll is an uninhabited atoll of the Tuamotu Archipelago in French Polynesia. It is located 12 kilometres (7.5 miles) to the east of Faaite Atoll.

Tahanea Atoll measures 48 kilometres (30 mi) in length with a maximum width of 15.2 kilometres (9.4 miles). The southern reef fringing the atoll is wider than the northern one, but the largest islands are on the narrower northern rim. Tahanea has a wide and deep lagoon with a surface area of 545 square kilometres (210 square miles). There are three deep, navigable passes into the lagoon: Motupuapua, Teavatapu, and Otao.

Tahanea is uninhabited, but visited occasionally by islanders from neighboring atolls.

== History ==
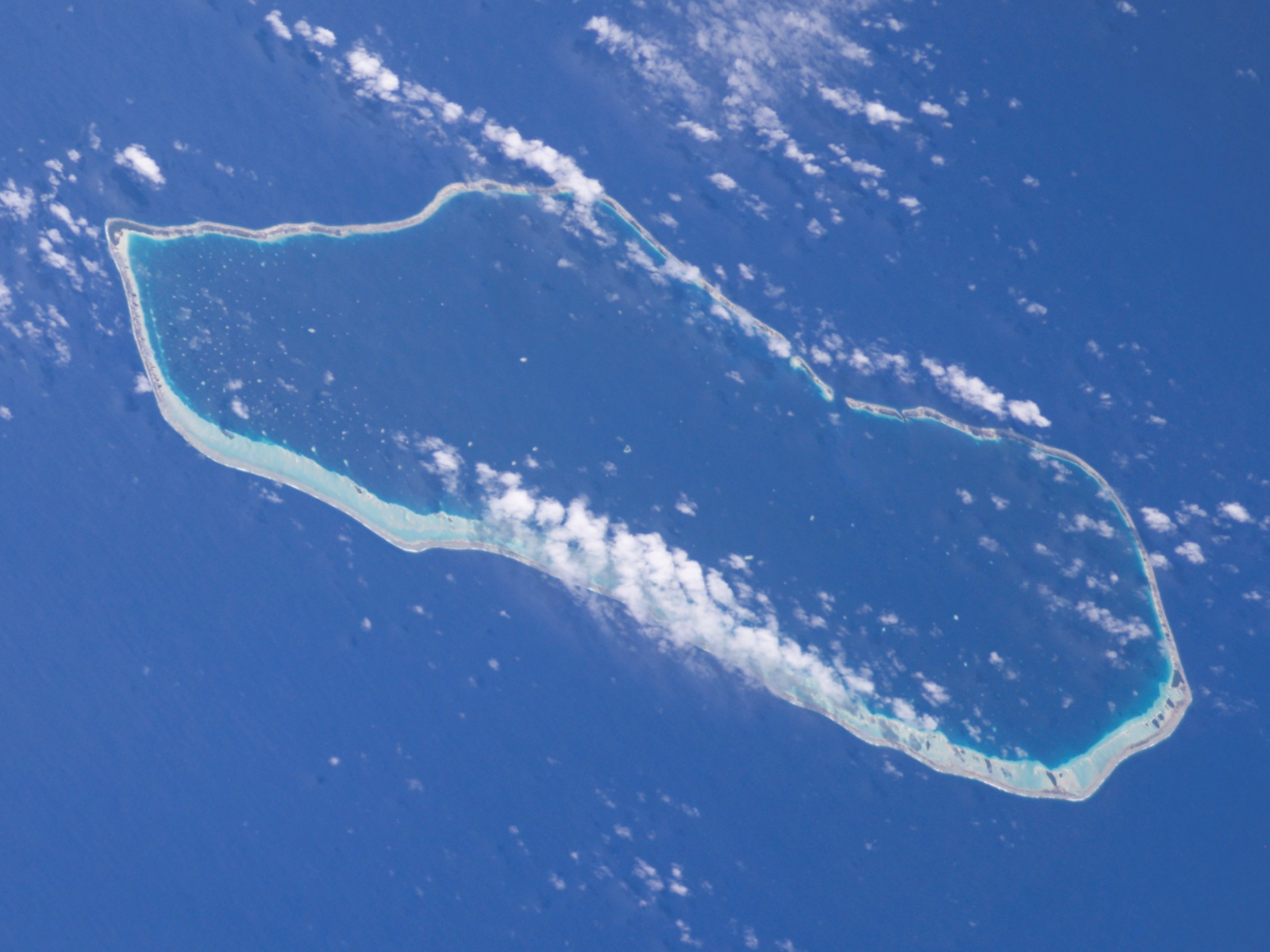
NASA picture of Tahanea Atoll.

The first recorded European to sight Tahanea was Spanish navigator Domingo de Boenechea on 9 November 1774 on the ship Aguila. He named this atoll "San Julián".

Russian oceanic explorer Fabian Gottlieb von Bellingshausen visited Tahanea in 1820 on ships Vostok and Mirni. He named this atoll "Chichagov".

== Administration ==
Tahanea belongs to the commune of Anaa that also includes the associated commune of Faaite with the atoll of Faaite and the uninhabited atolls of Tahanea and Motutunga.

== See also ==
- Desert island
- List of islands
