= Faaite =

Atoll in French Polynesia

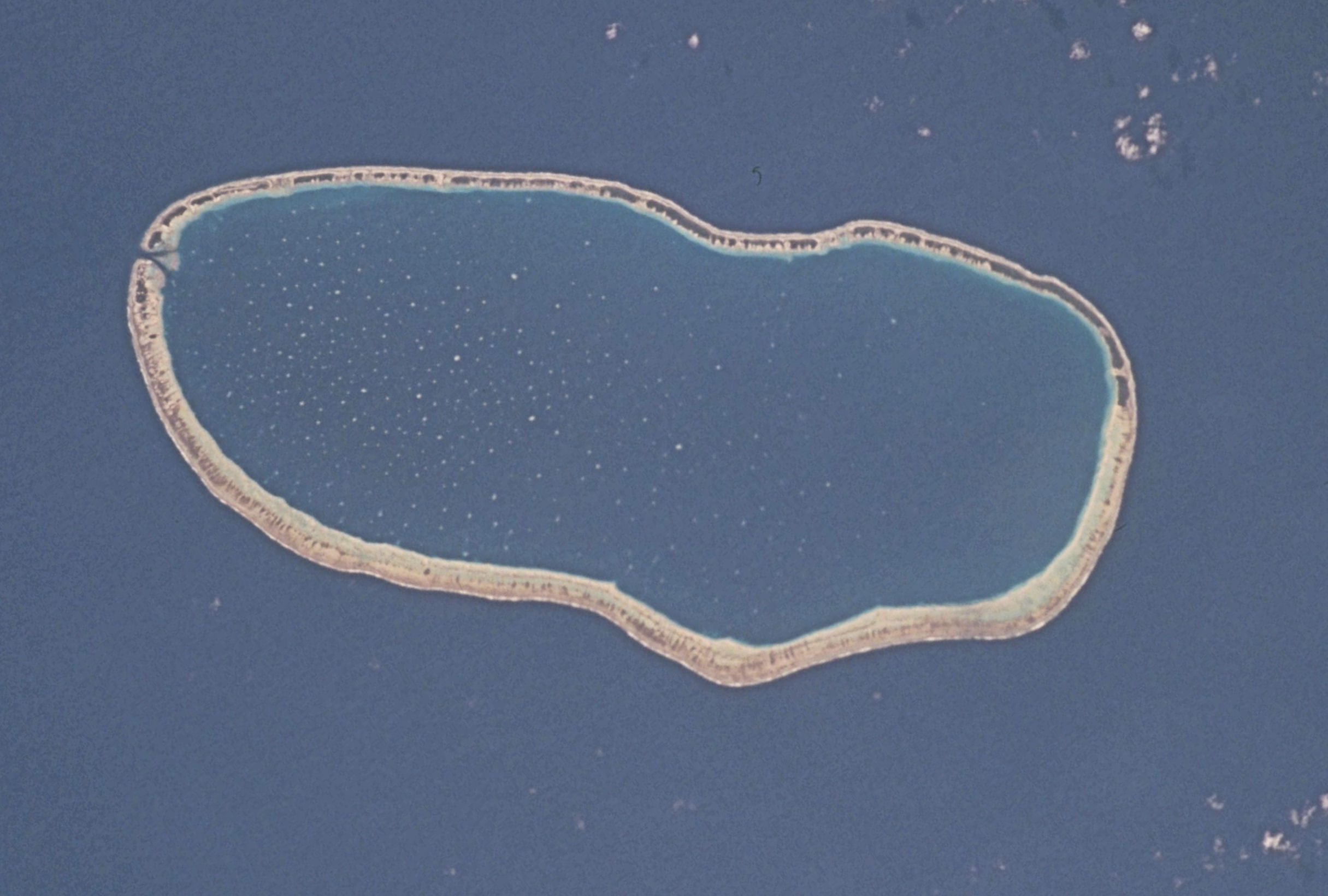
- NASA picture of Faaite Atoll

- Location within French Polynesia

Geography
- Location: Pacific Ocean
- Coordinates: 16°43′S 145°19′W
- Archipelago: Tuamotus
- Area: 227 km^{2} (88 sq mi) (lagoon); 8.87 km^{2} (3.42 sq mi) (above water)
- Length: 28 km (17.4 mi)
- Width: 10.5 km (6.52 mi)

Administration
- France
- Overseas collectivity: French Polynesia
- Administrative subdivision: Tuamotus
- Commune: Anaa
- Largest settlement: Hitianau (pop. 246)

Demographics
- Population: 440 (2022)
- Pop. density: 50/km^{2} (130/sq mi)

NASA picture of Faaite Atoll.

Faaite, or Faaiti is an atoll of the Tuamotus in French Polynesia. It is located 60 kilometres (37 miles) to the north of Anaa Atoll. The total surface of the atoll is 227 square kilometres (88 square miles). Its dry land area is 8.87 square kilometres (3.42 square miles). Its length is 28 kilometres (17 miles) and its width 10.5 kilometres (6.5 miles). The total population as of 2022 is 440 inhabitants.

Faaite's inner lagoon has a navigable channel to the ocean. The main village is Hitianau, with a total population of 246.

== History ==
The first recorded sighting of the atoll by Europeans was by the Spanish expedition of Pedro Fernández de Quirós on 11 February 1606. It was charted as Decena (ten in Spanish). John Turnbull rediscovered it in 1802. Turnbull was the first retailer in the Pacific to use the route from Tahiti to Hawaii. Russian oceanic explorer Fabian Gottlieb von Bellingshausen visited Faaite in 1820 on the ships Vostok and Mirni. He named this atoll "Miloradovich".

From September 2 to September 4, 1987, the population experienced a collective hysteria incited by a religious leader from the "Charismatic Renewal" who convinced the locals that the Devil inhabited the island. Six islanders were thrown into a fire and burned alive in an exorcism frenzy.

== Administration ==
Administratively, Faaite belongs to the commune of Anaa, which includes the inhabited atoll of Faaite and the uninhabited atolls of Tahanea and Motutunga.

== Transport ==
The island is connected to the world via Faaite Airport.
