= Txoko =

Basque form of gastronomic society

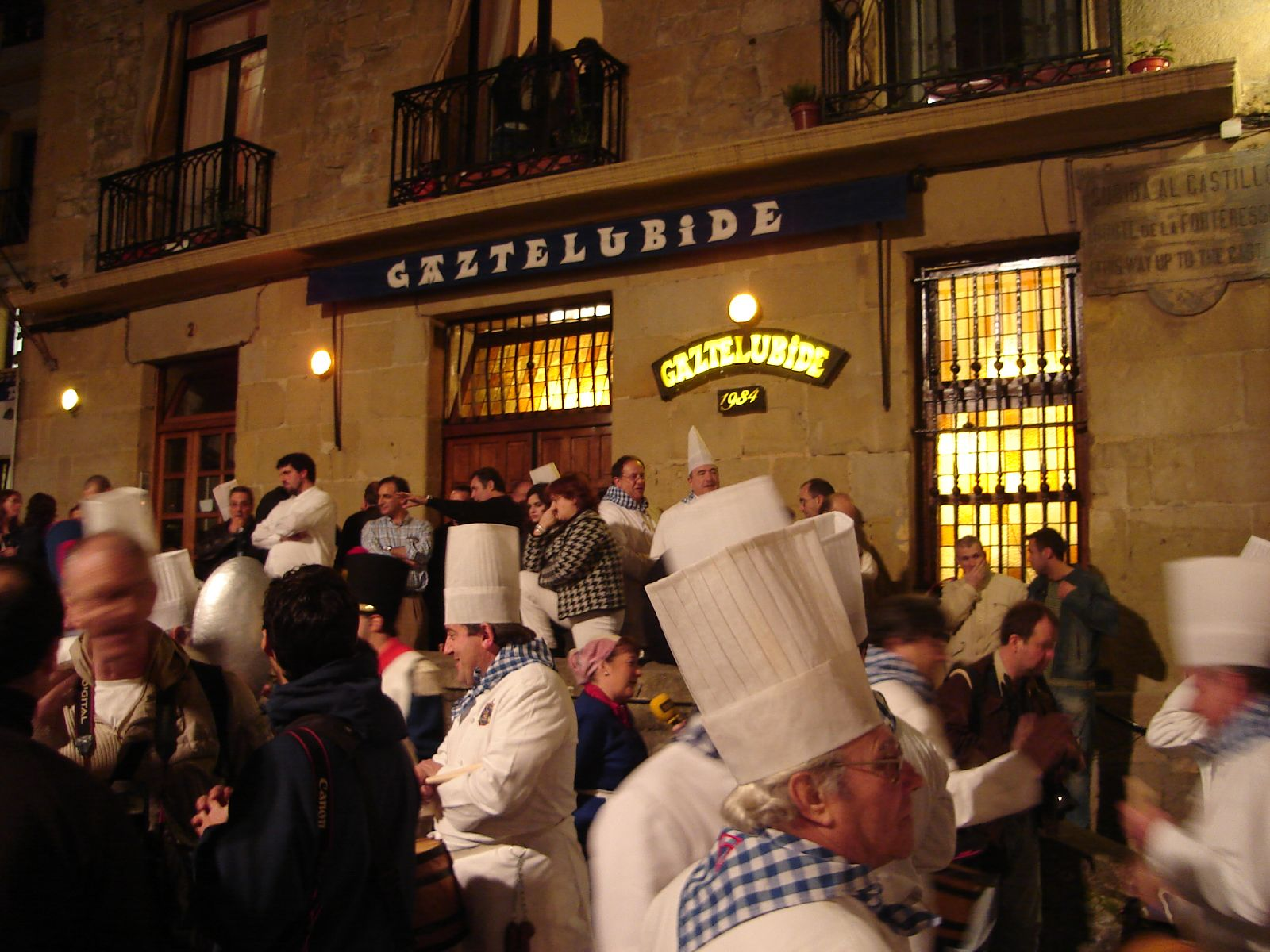
A gathering of chefs in front of the Gaztelubide txoko during the Tamborrada.

A Txoko (Basque pronunciation: [ˈtʃoko]) is a typically Basque type of closed gastronomical society where men come together to cook, experiment with new ways of cooking, eat and socialize. It is believed that over 1000 of these societies exist; the town of Gernika, Spain, for example, with around 15,000 inhabitants, has nine txokos with some 700 members in total. Txoko can be found not only in Spain but in almost any city with a significant number of Basques.

== Name ==
Txoko, a diminutive form of zoko, literally means nook, cosy corner in Basque. In some regions, the variant xoko is used. In Spanish, they are called sociedades gastronómicas, in French sociétés gastronomiques.

== History ==
The origins of the txoko are uncertain. They may have begun in Bilbao, Spain, as (perhaps inspired by the British) company social clubs, however they are most known in San Sebastián; where the first txoko was formed in 1870 as an informal group of friends who met regularly to eat, drink, sing, and talk. During the Franco years, txokos became increasingly popular because they prohibited the discussion of politics, making them some of the few places where the state allowed Basque to be spoken and Basque songs to be sung. Most txoko are in Spain, however they have been formed in various places across the world.

== Organisation ==
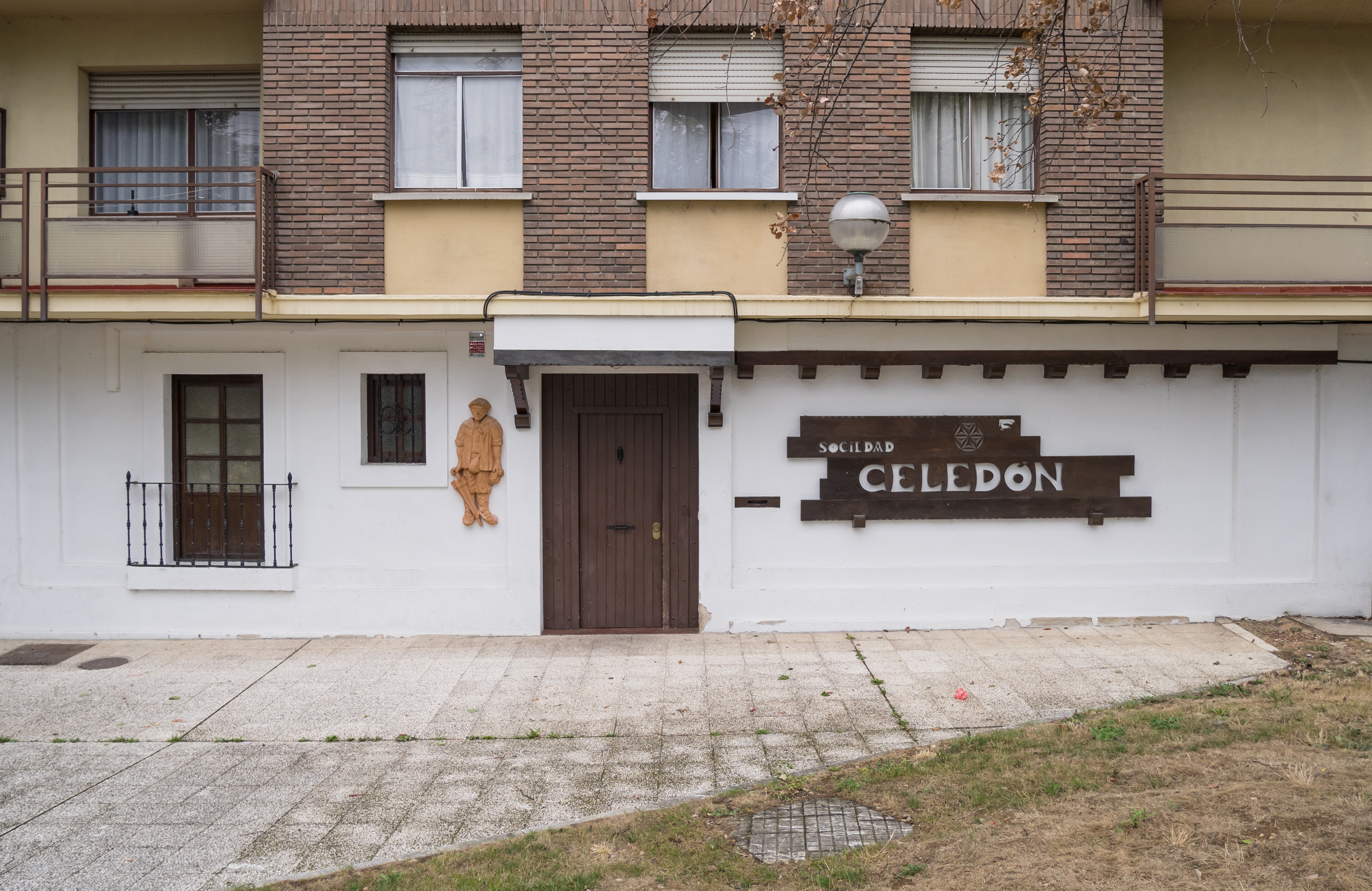
Sociedad Celedón, a txoko in Vitoria-Gasteiz

Normally, a txoko is set up by a group of friends who buy or rent suitable premises together and adopt a constitution covering membership, administration and other matters. The constitution normally prohibits the discussion of politics at the txoko and restricts the participation of women; either (rarely) forbidding them access to the txoko at all or more typically allowing women to enter the txoko to eat, drink and socialize, but not to cook. Modern txoko, using fresh ingredients and cooking from scratch, exemplify slow food.

Since a txoko typically has up to 80 members, but has space for fewer than that, individual or small groups of members get together to gathering the ingredients and cook for themselves, their families or guests. A few times a year, all txoko members are invited to get together.

== Impact ==
Hess, although describing the txoko as providing an escape from the daily grind of life in society, thus limited in its ability to benefit society as a whole, points to it as an expression of conviviality, and having a significant role in supporting Basque culture and identity, and in helping to manage the transition from a rural to an urban identity. Hess also suggested that the communal organisation and Roman Catholic influencing the choice of seasonal and weekly dishes represents a reaction against Protestant individualism. Membership of txoko crosses class and social divides, and such is their cultural importance in San Sebastian that the mayor is required annually to dine at each of the 75 txoko. Other authors point to the extreme conservatism of txokos: the exclusion of women and an emphasis on preserving traditional dishes.
