= Buenechea =

Buenechea is a Spanish spelling of a Basque surname which also occurs in the variants Bonechea, Buonechea, Boenechea and Bonachea. The modern Basque spellings are Buenetxea and Bonetxea. Most if not all families of this name are recognised in Spain as nobility with the status of Hidalgo. This surname is not common; Buenecheas and Buenetxeas between them number fewer than 100 in the whole of Spain, for the most part located in Gipuzkoa, where diocesan records indicate only around 1000 persons have been born with this name and its variants in the 300-year period 1600–1900. It is made up of the elements "buen, bon" (corruptions of "güen < goen < goien", 'upper') + "etxea" ('house'). The name therefore is originally related to "Goyenetch(e)", "Goyenech(e)" and "Go(i)enetxe".

== Arms ==
All indigenous Basques are in theory armigerous. One family has the following blazon: Urdin eta zilar koloreko uhinen gainean, izurdea. Gorri bizizko hegala, eta bertan urrezko zortzi panela. i.e. Wavy azure and argent, a dolphin spiny, bordure gules eight water-lily leaves or.

== Notable people ==
- Ygnacio de Bonechea Manterola proved his status of Hidalgo in 1725, tracing his ancestors back to Domingo Bonechea (floruit circa 1645), a descendent of the Bonechea Casa Solar of Asteasu, where members of the family are attested under the name Bofonechea up to 1618.
- A Domingo de Bonechea proved his status of Hidalgo before the Justices at Zarauz in 1738. It is unclear if this was the same person as the explorer (see below). A Juan Ignacio de Bonechea proved his status of Hidalgo before the Justices of Aya (Guipuzcoa) in 1772. Furthermore, Francisco Bonachea Zabala and his son Agustin Bonechea Martinez also were confirmed as Hidalgos in 1762 and 1778 respectively.
- Domingo de Bonechea Andonaegui, an 18th-century explorer, mentioned by Georg Forster in his account Voyage Around the World as "Domingo Buenechea"
- Asenzio, Francisco and Antonio de Bonechea y Garate born respectively in 1717, 1719 and 1725, proved their nobility and status of hidalguia before the magistrates of Zumaia in 1773.
- Manuel de Agote y Bonechea (1775–1803) from Getaria who kept a diary of his travels with the Spanish Royal Philippines Company
- Francisco Bonechea Andonaegui, (1717–1761) brother of Domingo, served as a lieutenant in the Spanish navy under the Marques de la Victoria and died at Puerto Caballo.
- Francisco Bonechea in 1748 served as Frigate Captain aboard the Galga under Captain Blas de la Barreda. He is mentioned again in 1774 still as Frigate Captain
- Alexandro Bonechea Vicana (1689–1741) died of wounds received in the defence of Cartagena de Indias during the War of Jenkins' Ear.
- Manuel de Buenechea, married Concessa Echezarreta in 1737, died 1770, pilot of the doomed ship Oriflama which sank with him and his brothers Bartolome and Joseph de Bonechea aboard.
- José Ramón Leocadio Bonachea y Hernández (1845–1885) Cuban revolutionary general, executed by firing squad
- Juan Antonio de Bonachea Echezarreta, (b. 1746, Aizarnazabal) son of Manuel, captain in the Spanish Navy serving in Peru who investigated the disappearance of the Oriflama of which his father was the pilot
- Vicente de Bonechea Ybarbia, (later spelled Buenechea) (1810–1884), grandson of Francisco de Bonechea Garate, an entrepreneur from Zarautz who set up an important cooperage and pickling business in the 1830s. He provided immense vats for storing wine to be sent to Espartero in exile in London in the 1840s. Known as "Vicente Txiki," he later set up a gasworks which illuminated the city, and established a salting business at the corner of calle San Martin and calle Urbieta in San Sebastian whose barrels were used as the drums for the first Tamborradas in the 1840s
- Oscar Poey Bonachea
- Don Felix Buenechea Apaolaza (1845–1916), son of Vicente Txiki, Parish Priest of the Church of San Vicente, San Sebastián, Guipuzcoa.
- Pedro Buenechea Apaolaza, ("Perico Chipiron") (1853–1932), a son of Vicente Txiki, a judge and property owner who acquired buildings in Aldamar, San Sebastian, and businesses in the nearby old quarter, which still survive as Buenechea y Hernando
- Ramon Buenechea Apaolaza (born 1851), also a son of Vicente Txiki, inherited the salting and barrelling business. In 1888 the factory in San Martin was compulsorily purchased by order of the ayuntamiento and he moved the business to a building known as Mira-Amara in the Amara district of San Sebastian. By 1894 he was employing up to 100 people, manufacturing 3000-4000 barrels ("cuarterolas") annually and exporting 1500 barrels of salt fish (besugo, papardo, perlón and tuna) to the interior per year. His only child died young, but he did not leave the business to his brother Pedro, in consequence of which Pedro was found in the Aero Club (San Sebastian) wearing a red tie on the day of the funeral, explaining that he thought he had had a brother but had been mistaken.
- Candido Buenechea Zabaleta born in Tolosa in 1860 was a composer in the Basque style winning prizes in the 1890s
- Miguel Bonachea (born Santa Clara, Cuba 1960), Cuban guitarist and professor
