= Pueu =

Pūeu
- Associated commune of Tai'arapu-Est
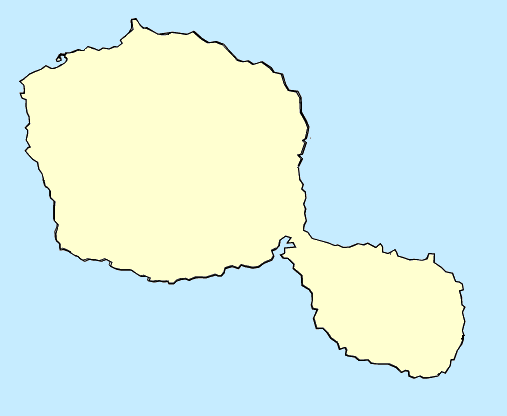
- Location within Tahiti
- Location of Pūeu
- Coordinates: 17°44′14″S 149°13′36″W
- Country: France
- Overseas collectivity: French Polynesia
- Commune: Tai'arapu-Est
- Population (2022): 2,076
- Time zone: UTC−10:00

Pūeu is a village and district on the east coast of Tahiti, 66 km (41 mi) south east of Papeʻete and northwest by road from Tautira.

== Geography ==
The village lies on a lagoon.

== History ==
The Spaniards named the harbour within the Pūeu reef "Puerto de la Virgen".

In 1958, 61.6% of the villagers of the district voted for independence.

== Culture ==
It hosts a spiritual festival on Christmas Day.

Pūeu contains an old church and the Te Anuanua Hotel, located to the southeast of the church, with four duplex bungalows.
