= Tautira =

- Associated commune of Taiarapu-Est
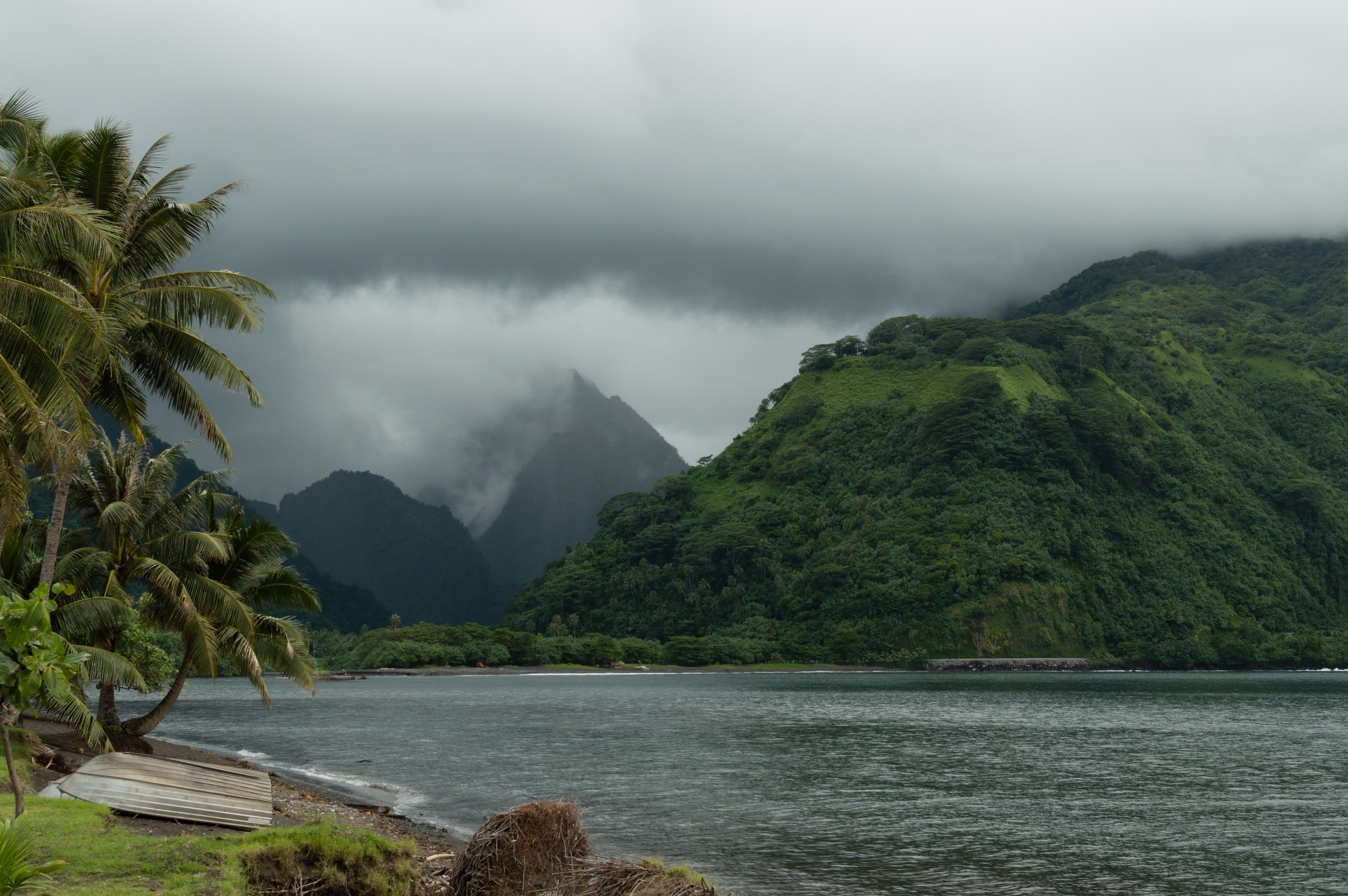
- Tautira Beach and surrounding mountains

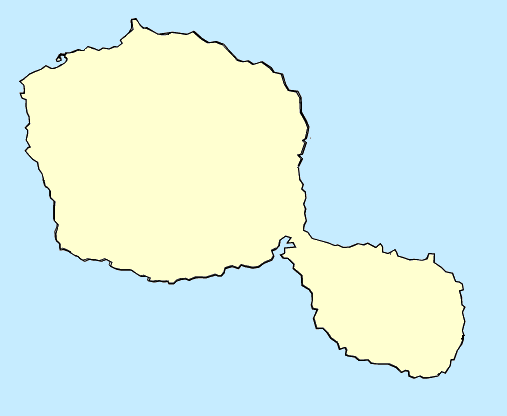
- Location within Tahiti
- Location of Tautira
- Coordinates: 17°44′50″S 149°9′40″W
- Country: France
- Overseas collectivity: French Polynesia
- Commune: Taiarapu-Est
- Population (2022): 2,527
- Time zone: UTC−10:00

Tautira is a Polynesian beach village, valley, and point on the south-east coast of the island of Tahiti in the Pacific. It is part of the commune Taiʻarapu-Est. With a population of 2,527 (in 2022), it is located 49 kilometres southeast of the Tahitian capital of Papeete on the coast of Tautira Bay, at the end of what is the largest valley of the Taiarapu Peninsula. Domingo de Bonechea visited the area in 1772 and attempted to spread Christianity here; James Cook landed at Tautira Bay during his voyage. Robert Louis Stevenson referred to the village as “The Garden of the World”, staying here to recover from illness in 1886. The village contains a Catholic church.

== History ==
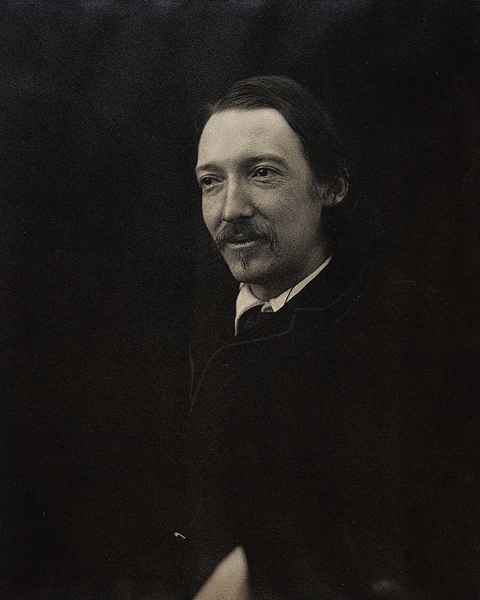
Portrait of Robert Louis Stevenson, 1885.

Tautira is where Catholic missionaries first landed which eventually led to the takeover of Tahiti by the French people, and which also ended Protestants' hold on Tahiti: In 1773 the Spaniards established a catholic mission, of two friars, in the bay of Tautira, which was abandoned at eleven months. Earlier, in 1772, Domingo de Bonechea, the Basque captain landed at Aguilla near the Aiurua River, about 10 kilometres (6.2 mi) from Tautira. He had left two missionaries to try convert the indigenous people to Christianity, in 1772. However, when he returned from Peru in 1775 he found that the two missionaries he had left behind on Tahiti failed to convert the natives, and eventually they preferred to return to Peru. However, de Bonechea died on Tahiti during this campaign and he is buried in the Catholic Church in Tautira, which is now named after him. James Cook had landed at Tautira Bay (or "Cooks Anchorage") during his voyage. The chiefs of Tautira were reportedly once replaced by the chiefs of Teahupo'o after conflict.

In 1886, Robert Louis Stevenson, the author of Treasure Island, The Strange Case of Dr Jekyll and Mr Hyde and other children's books, stayed here for two months to recuperate from his illness. Stevenson had moved to the village from Papeete and lived in a hut called the "bird-cage house" where the beautiful Princess Moe, an old lady of royalty, tended him back to good health, bringing him dishes of raw fish in coconut milk, lime juice, sea water and chilli. The local chief, Ori O Ori, befriended him and kept him in his house, and they had even exchanged names as “Rui” and “Terii-Tera”. It was during his stay here that Stevenson wrote to his friends calling Tautira as “The Garden of the World”. In 1915, Tautira was described as being "the second town of the island".

== Geography ==
It is located at a distance of 49 kilometres (30 mi) from Papeʻete, the capital city of Tahiti. The coastal stretch of the mountainous road extends from Taravoa to Tautira via Pueu. This stretch of the coast also receives the highest rainfall. An 18 kilometres (11 mi) stretch of highway links Tautira with Taravao. The Tautira River runs nearby, and there is a beach at the mouth of the Vaitepiha River nearby as well.

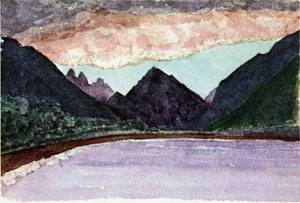
Henry Adams, "Afterglow in the Tautira Valley ", 1891

Tautira is the largest valley of the Taiarapu Peninsula, resembling Papenoʻo in that its innermost areas consist of the principal crater-basin. The valley runs outward in a direction a little to the west of north, and is traversed by a large river. The boundaries of the Tautira Valley are high and well marked. Aionifaa Valley lies between Tautira and Aiurua.

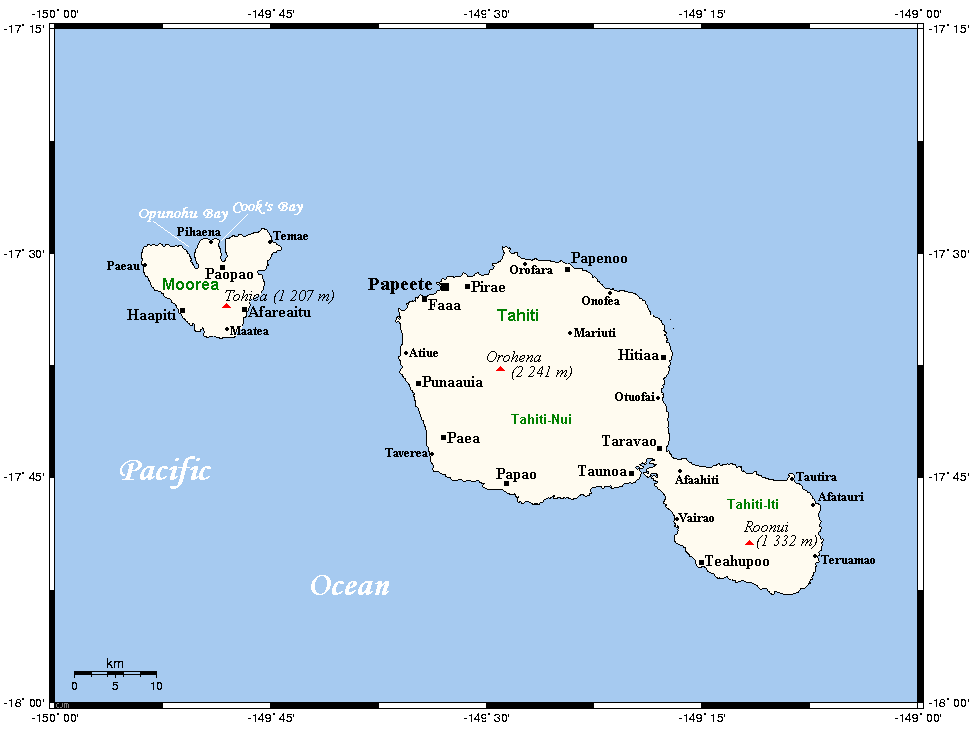
Map of Tahiti, with Tautira near bottom right

Tautira Point is a tongue of low wooded land about 600 yards wide, extending northward .75 miles (1.21 km) from the general line of the coast and from the foot of the mountains. It is formed by the deposits from the Vaitepiha River, one of the largest streams in Tahiti. The barrier reef fronts the coast from Aiurua Pass to Tautira Point at 3,000 feet (910 m) and less from the shore. It encloses channels and basins of deep water. From Vaionifa Pass, barrier reef trends northwestward in a straight line, rounding Tautira Point at only 1,200 feet (370 m) and breaking off abruptly just westward of the point, where there is a gap with very deep water 2,400 feet (730 m) wide before the reef begins again. Between Vaionifa and Tautira, there is a smaller gap about 1,200 feet (370 m) wide in which there is only 9 feet (2.7 m) of water. Between this pass and Tautira, there is a channel from 1,200–1,800 feet (370–550 m) wide and 2.5 miles (4.0 km) long which ends in a cul-de-sac at the northern end, with the exception of a small boat passage to the village.

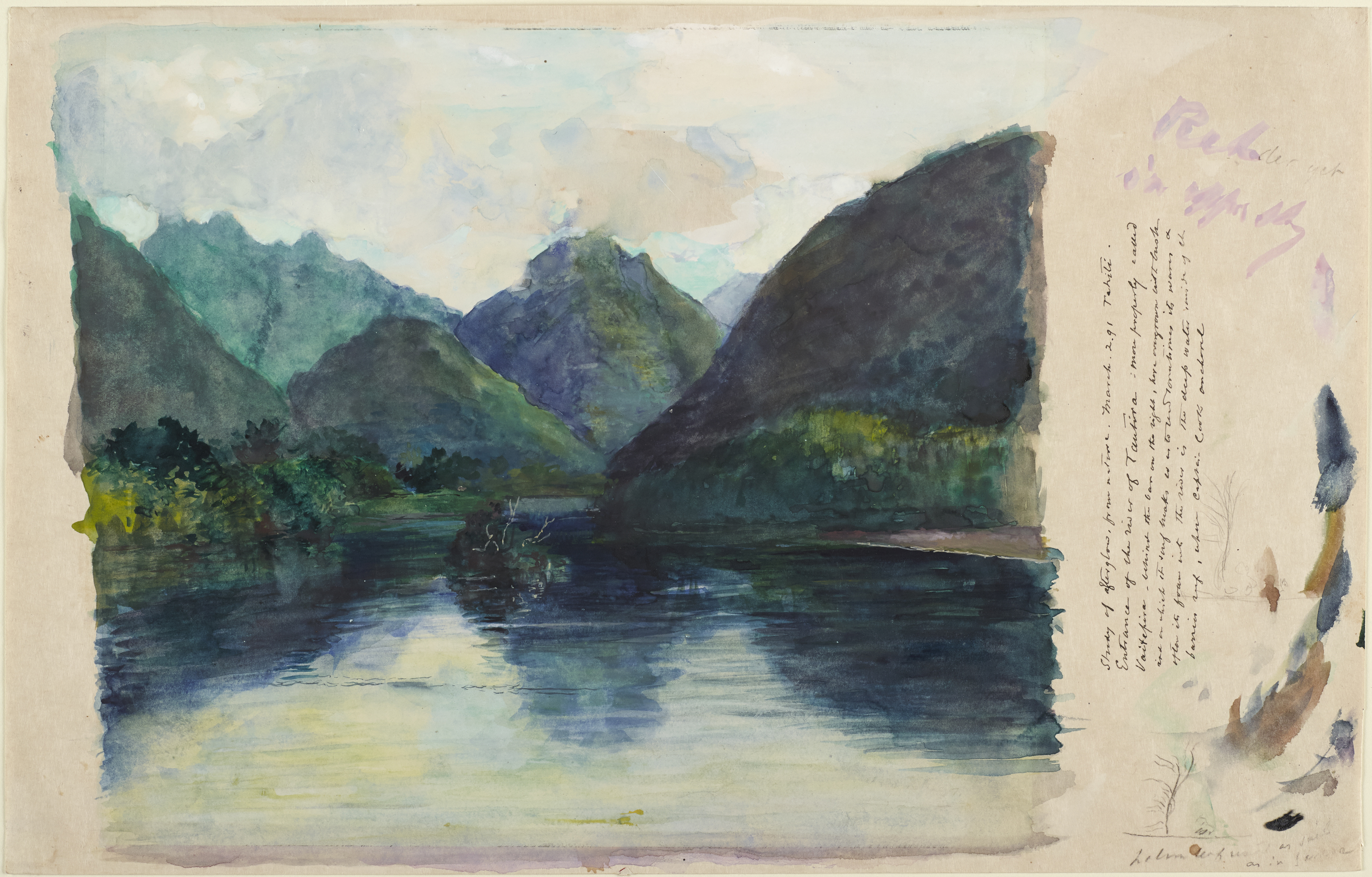
John La Farge, Study of Afterglow from Nature (Tahiti: Entrance to Tautira Valley), 1891, Princeton University Art Museum

From 19 to 37 fathoms there is mud almost everywhere. At the northern end the soundings decrease gradually to 16 and 8 fathoms. From Tautira Point, the coast trends westward 5 miles (8.0 km) to a short distance beyond Pueu village. The general direction is straight, but two low and wooded points, Pihaa and Faraari, project about 500 yards to seaward; the first at 2.5 miles (4.0 km) from Tautira, the second about 1 mile (1.6 km) farther on. The mountains behind, from which numerous cascades descend, are steep and cliff-like.

When Stevenson had visited Tautira in 1888 cruising through the South Seas, he had described the setting of the village as "...in a cloudy moonlight, on the forest lawn which is the street of Tautira. The Pacific roared outside upon the reef. Here and there one of the scattered palm-built lodges shone out under the shadow of the wood, the lamplight bursting through the crannies of the wall.” The present scene, however, in Tautira is one of “neat bungalows of wood or cinder block with metal roofs" in the backdrop of the hills of the Vaitepiha River Valley. About one km of trekking along hilly terrain leads to the Vaitepiha River where three maraes (communal or sacred place which serves religious and social purposes in Polynesian societies) were restored in 1960s. However, they are again in ruins.

== Climate ==
According to the data recorded at the NOAA Station Id: FP91000987470110, the climatic conditions at Tautira are reported as: Annual average monthly precipitation is 299.11 millimetres (11.776 in) with a maximum of 474.1 millimetres (18.67 in) in December and a minimum of 133.7 millimetres (5.26 in) in August, with average annual incidence of rainfall being 3,590.3 millimetres (141.35 in). The average high temperature over the year is 28.59 °C (83.46 °F) and minimum over the year is 22.87 °C (73.17 °F). The effect of global warming due to climate change has been predicted an increase of 1 °C (34 °F) and 2 °C (36 °F).

Climate data for Tautira, French Polynesia
Month	Jan	Feb	Mar	Apr	May	Jun	Jul	Aug	Sep	Oct	Nov	Dec	Year
Mean daily maximum °C (°F)	29.4 (84.9)	29.6 (85.3)	30.0 (86.0)	29.8 (85.6)	28.9 (84.0)	27.3 (81.1)	27.1 (80.8)	27.8 (82.0)	27.8 (82.0)	27.9 (82.2)	28.5 (83.3)	29.0 (84.2)	28.6 (83.5)
Mean daily minimum °C (°F)	23.0 (73.4)	23.1 (73.6)	23.3 (73.9)	23.6 (74.5)	23.0 (73.4)	22.7 (72.9)	22.6 (72.7)	22.0 (71.6)	22.4 (72.3)	22.8 (73.0)	22.8 (73.0)	23.1 (73.6)	22.9 (73.2)
Average precipitation mm (inches)	456.8 (17.98)	374.5 (14.74)	325.0 (12.80)	313.2 (12.33)	246.2 (9.69)	223.5 (8.80)	170.8 (6.72)	133.7 (5.26)	145.6 (5.73)	299.7 (11.80)	426.9 (16.81)	474.4 (18.68)	3,590.3 (141.35)
Source: World Climate

== Flora and fauna ==
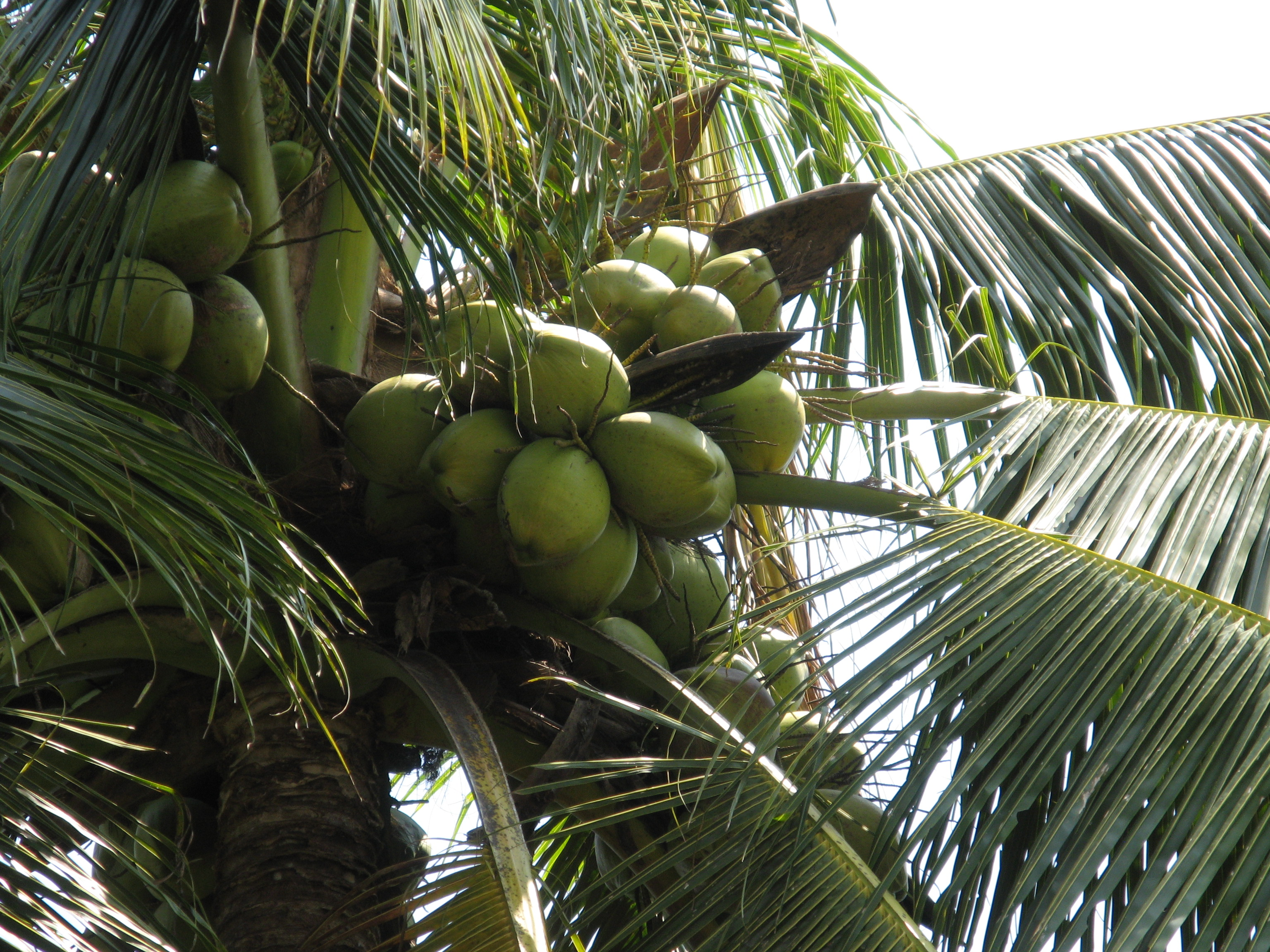
Coconut palm tree

The Feʻi, similar to a red banana, is found here and has to be cooked, as the red skin cover in its raw state an inedible pulp.

Coconut palm with ironwood, milo, mango tree and ulu trees fringe the coastline. Mango tree, ferns and groves of hala trees are seen in the interior valley.

Partula otaheitana rubescens, an IUCN Red List endangered animalia species, is located in Tautira.

== Demographics ==
The demographic evolution of Tautira :

Demographic evolution
1977	1983	1988	1996	2002	2007
1 163	1 411	1 763	2 447	2 343	2 338
Sources ISPF, Mairie de Tautira * : estimation

== Culture ==
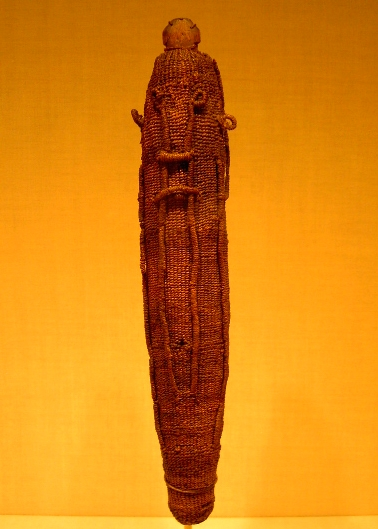
A depiction of the god figure 'Oro whose temple in Tautira was destroyed by Pōmare II.

In the 19th century, Tautira boasted a Chinese store and a church. The Catholic Church, Protestants, and Mormon missions were in juxtaposition in the village. When Pōmare II returned to kingship in Tahiti, he became a Christian, and destroyed the temple and idol of 'Oro, the national god of Tahiti, at Tautira.

== Transportation ==
=== Air ===
The Faaa International Airport close to Papeʻete is the main use of transportation in Tautira. Air Tahiti serves inter-island flights to other islands within French Polynesia. Air France takes passengers to Los Angeles, California. Other destinations are Honolulu, Hawaii; Tokyo, Japan; and Paris, France. The residents of Tautira would drive to Teahupoo and drive northbound toward Faaa. One helipad is nearby and some helicopters drop off passengers.

=== Road ===
Only a few streets of Tautira are paved while the rest are dirt.

=== Sea ===
The Papeete Wharf in Papeʻete has 3 main ships. They are the Aremiti 5, the Aremiti 7, and the Moorea ferry. The Aremiti 5 is the largest of the ships. It has red stripes with a red background. The Aremiti 7 has the same color but is smaller and faster than the Aremiti 5. The Moorea Ferry is white on the top and blue at the bottom. It is the slowest of the 3 ships. Tautira has a smaller port with a few private docks.
