= French ship Oriflamme (1744) =

Ship of the line of the French Navy

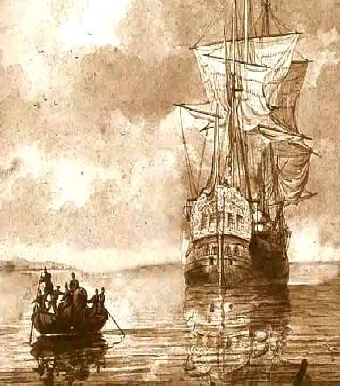

History

France
- Name: Oriflamme
- Ordered: 16 February 1743
- Builder: Toulon
- Laid down: April 1743
- Launched: 30 October 1744
- Commissioned: December 1744
- Captured: 1 April 1761, by HMS Isis of the Royal Navy

Spain
- Name: Oriflama
- Fate: Lost at sea between 25–28 July 1770

General characteristics
- Class & type: 56-gun ship of the line
- Displacement: 1600 tonneaux
- Tons burthen: 1000 port tonneaux
- Length: 135 French feet
- Beam: 37 French feet
- Draught: 18½ French feet
- Depth of hold: 17¾ French feet
- Propulsion: Sails
- Sail plan: Full-rigged ship
- Complement: 380 men, + 5/10 officers
- Armament: 56 guns of various weights of shot (reduced to 50 guns in 1757)

Oriflamme was a 56-gun ship of the line of the French Navy. She was ordered on 16 February 1743 and built at Toulon Dockyard by engineer-constructor Pierre-Blaise Coulomb, and launched on 30 October 1744. She carried 24 × 18-pounder guns on her lower deck, 26 × 8-pounder guns on her upper deck, and 6 × 4-pounder guns on her quarterdeck (although the latter smaller guns were removed when she was rebuilt at Toulon from August 1756 to July 1757). The ship was named for the oriflamme, a long, multi-tailed red banner that was historically the battle standard of the Capetian dynasty.

== French career ==
On 16 April 1746, Oriflamme recaptured the 24-gun frigate Volage, that the 70-gun HMS Stirling Castle had taken the day before.

She narrowly survived one encounter with the Royal Navy during the Seven Years' War, but was captured during a later engagement by HMS Isis off Cape Trafalgar, on 1 April 1761. She was not taken into British service but was used as a merchant ship, ending her days in Spanish service. She sailed on her last voyage in 1770, but her crew apparently succumbed to a plague and the ship was lost at sea.

The oriflamme of the Capetian dynasty

Following her reconstruction in 1756-57, the Oriflamme served during the Seven Years' War, and had an encounter with a superior British squadron in late February 1758, when she was chased off the Spanish coast by the 60-gun HMS Montagu, under Captain Joshua Rowley and the 74-gun HMS Monarch under Captain John Montagu. They chased Oriflamme onshore, but owing to Spain's neutrality at the time, did not attempt to destroy her, and Oriflamme was later salvaged.

Oriflamme again encountered the British, this time when she was chased by the 50-gun HMS Isis, under Captain Edward Wheeler, off the Mediterranean coast of Morocco on 1 April 1761. The two engaged at 6pm, with Wheeler being killed early in the exchange of fire. Command then devolved to Lieutenant Cunningham, who on seeing that the French ship was trying to escape towards Spain, ran aboard her, and soon forced her to strike her colours. Oriflamme, which had been armed en flûte and was carrying between 40 and 50 guns during the action, had 50 killed and wounded from her complement of around 370. Isis had four killed, including Wheeler, and nine wounded. The captured Oriflamme was brought into Gibraltar.

== Spanish career ==
Oriflamme was not brought into the Royal Navy, but was instead sold into mercantile service. She appears to have then entered Spanish service, and was sold at auction to the company of Juan Baptista de Uztaris, Bros & Co.

She set sail on her final voyage on 18 February 1770, departing Cádiz under the command of Captain Joseph Antonio de Alzaga, with Joseph de Zavalsa as Master and Manuel de Buenechea as pilot. On 25 July she was sighted by the Gallardo, whose captain, Juan Esteban de Ezpeleta, knew de Alzaga. The Gallardo signalled to her with a cannon shot, but it went unanswered. The first officer of the Gallardo, Joseph de Alvarez, was sent to investigate and found that the Oriflama had been swept by a mysterious plague. Half the crew had already died, and the rest were dying, with only thirty men barely able to haul a sail.

De Alvarez returned to his ship and a boatload of supplies was prepared, but bad weather drove the ships apart and it was impossible to catch up with the Oriflama. It was reported that as the crew of the Gallardo prayed for the safety of the men of the Oriflama, a ghostly light illuminated the latter's sails and she was seen to sail away into the night. On 28 July wreckage of the Oriflama and some bodies were washed up on the coast of Chile near the mouth of the Huenchullami River.

The following spring Manuel de Amat y Juniet, the Viceroy of Peru, sent Juan Antonio de Bonachea, the son of the pilot of the Oriflama (Buenechea and Bonachea were interchangeable spellings), with trained divers to search for the wreck, but the search was abandoned in January 1772.
