= Faaite Airport =

- IATA: FAC; ICAO: NTKF

Summary
- Airport type: Public
- Serves: Hitianau, Faaite
- Location: Tuamotu Archipelago, French Polynesia
- Elevation AMSL: 7 ft / 2 m
- Coordinates: 16°41′13″S 145°19′58″W
- Interactive map of Faaite Airport

Runways
Direction	Length		Surface
Direction	m	ft	Surface
08/26	1,180	3,871	Paved
- Sources: Great Circle Mapper

Faaite Airport is an airport on Faaite in French Polynesia (IATA: FAC, ICAO: NTKF). It was inaugurated in 1992.

== See also ==
- List of airports in French Polynesia
