= Huenchullami River =

Location
- Country: Chile

Physical characteristics
- Mouth: Pacific Ocean
  - coordinates: 35°07′19″S 72°12′43″W

The Huenchullamí River is a river of the coastal area of Maule Region, in Chile. Its source is in the west of Pencahue, and runs to NW with the names of Libún, Batuco and Coipué, and after receiving Gualleco's creek waters, it takes the name of Huenchullamí River, and ends 10 or 12 km south from Mataquito River's mouth in La Trinchera beach.

This river divides the Communes of Curepto and Constitución.

== See also ==
- List of rivers of Chile
- French ship Oriflamme (1744)
