= Vaitepiha River =

River in Tahiti, French Polynesia

Coordinates: 17°44′54″S 149°09′50″W

Vaitepiha
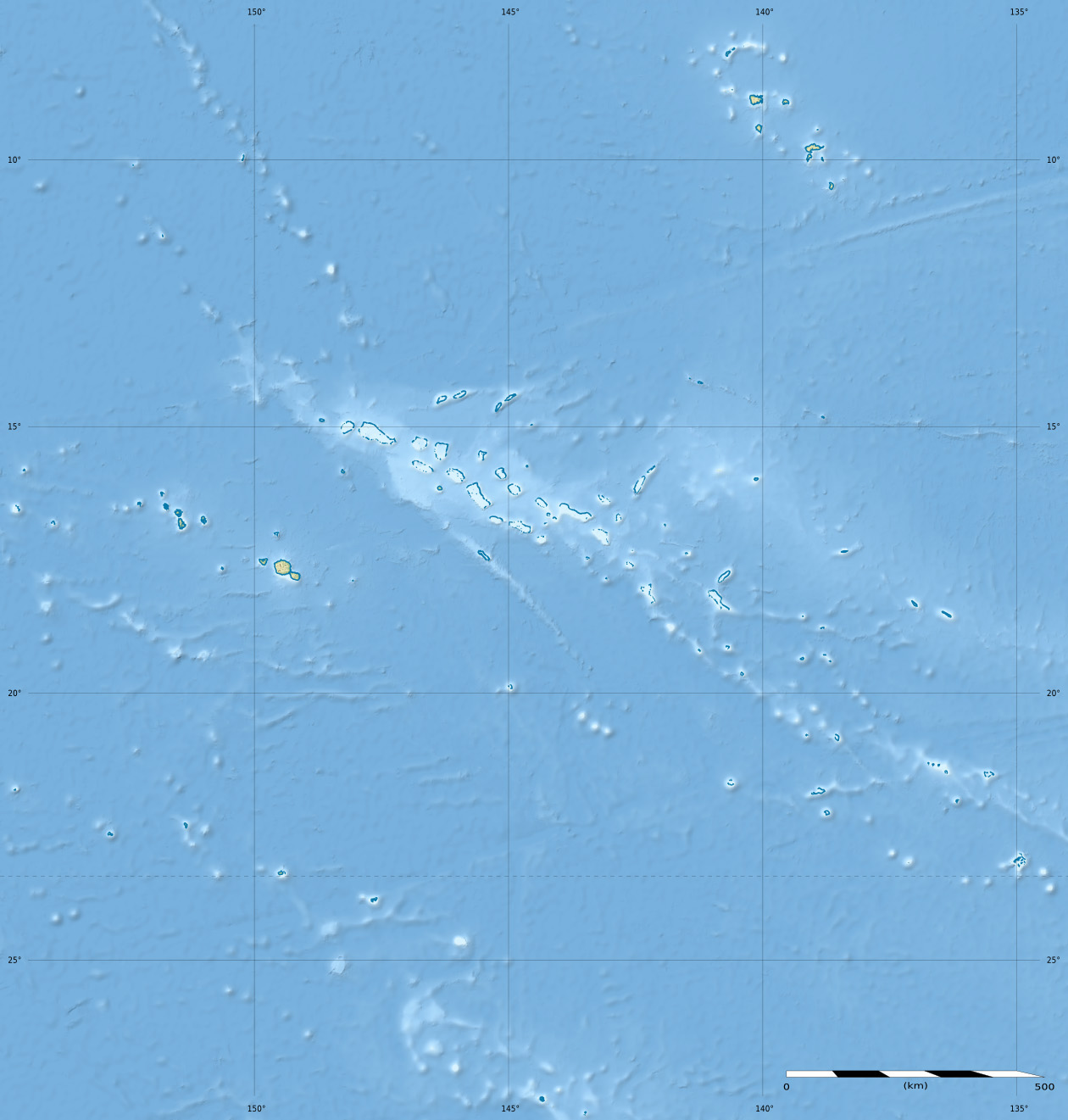
- Location within French Polynesia

Location
- Country: French Polynesia
- State: Tahiti
- Region: Tautira

Physical characteristics
- Mouth: Pacific Ocean
  - location: Tautira
  - elevation: 0 m (0 ft)

The Vaitepiha is a river and valley of southeastern Tahiti, French Polynesia. It flows into the sea at Tautira.
