= Tikei =

Island in French Polynesia

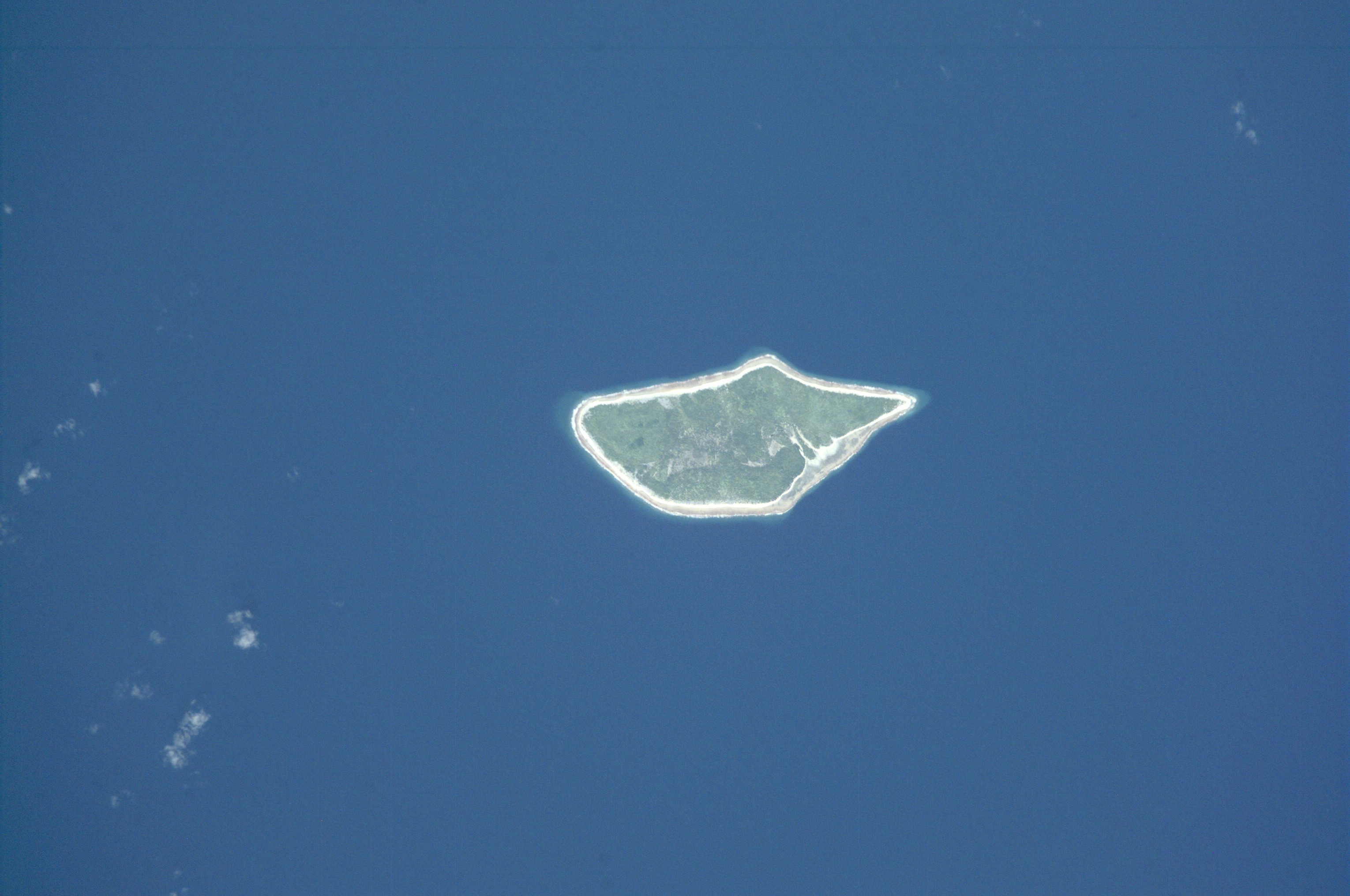
- NASA picture of Tikei Island

- Location within French Polynesia

Geography
- Location: Pacific Ocean
- Coordinates: 14°57′S 144°33′W
- Archipelago: Tuamotus
- Area: 4 km^{2} (1.5 sq mi)
- Length: 3.9 km (2.42 mi)
- Width: 1.6 km (0.99 mi)
- Highest elevation: 3 m (10 ft)

Administration
- France
- Overseas collectivity: French Polynesia
- Administrative subdivision: Tuamotus
- Commune: Takaroa

Demographics
- Population: Uninhabited (2012)

Tikei, also known as Manu, Tikai and Tiku is an island in the Tuamotu group in French Polynesia. Tikei is not a typical Tuamotu atoll, as its former lagoon filled in. The island is 3.9 kilometres (2.4 miles) long, 1.6 kilometres (1.0 mile) wide, and has a land area of 4 square kilometres (1.5 square miles). Its highest elevation is 3 metres (9.8 feet) above sea level.

Geographically Tikei is part of the King George Islands (Îles du Roi Georges) subgroup, which includes Ahe, Manihi, Takapoto, Takaroa and Tikei.

Tikei is uninhabited. There used to be human habitation and the main village was called Tereporepo. The closest land is Takapoto Atoll, located 73 kilometres (45 mi) to the northwest. Tikei Island has been poorly researched.

== History ==
The first recorded European to arrive to Tikei was Dutch mariner Jacob Roggeveen on May 18, 1722. He named this island "Carlshoff".

Russian mariner Otto von Kotzebue came to Tikei in 1816. He named it "Romanzov", after the main sponsor of his expedition and the Russian Minister of Foreign Affairs, Count Rumyantsev.

== Administration ==
Tikei belongs to the commune of Takaroa, which consists of the island of Takaroa, the island of Tikei and the atoll of Takapoto.

== See also ==
- Desert island
- List of islands
