= Carl Friedrich Behrens =

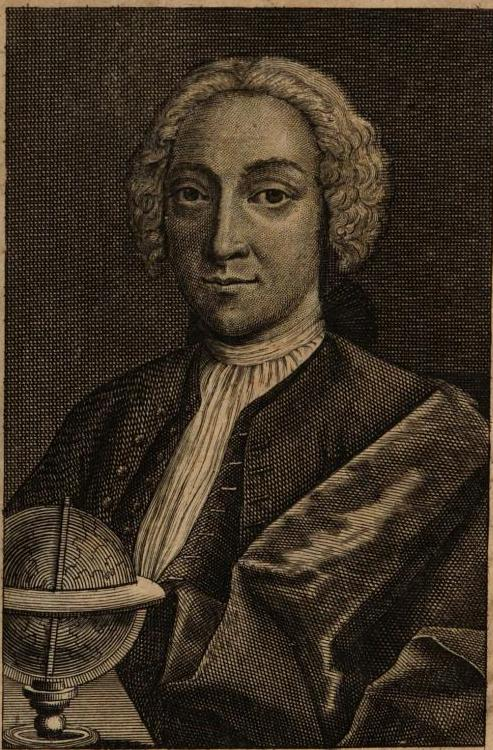
- Born: 1701; Rostock
- Died: 1750

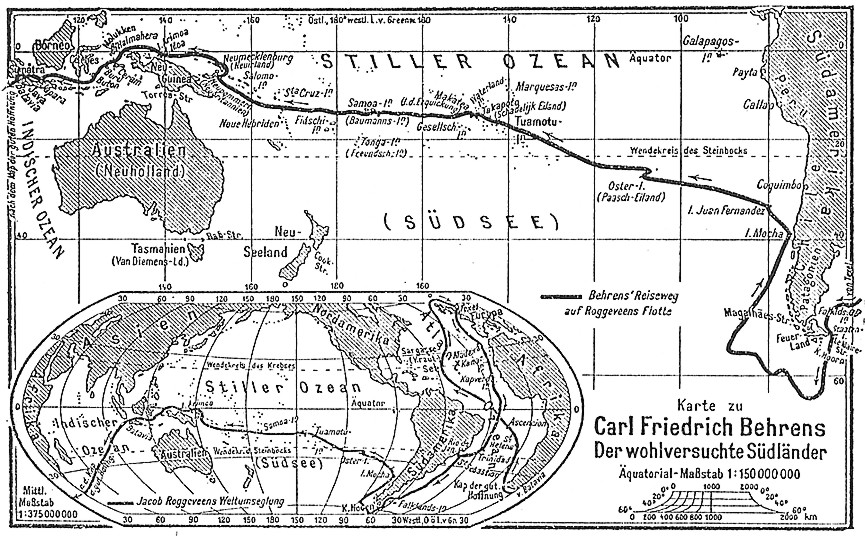
Map from Behrens' travel report

Carl Friedrich Behrens (Rostock in Mecklenburg, 1701–1750) was a German sailor and soldier who sailed as a corporal during the expedition led by Jacob Roggeveen to Southern Land, during which Easter Island was discovered, and he was among the first Europeans to set foot there.

== Biography ==
The 21-year-old Carl Friedrich enlisted in 1721 and set sail on August 1 of that year as a crew member of the sea voyage led by Jacob Roggeveen, with three ships and 244 soldiers and sailors. It was a project of the Dutch West India Company with the aim of exploring trade opportunities in the so-called "Southern Land." It was suspected that a large inhabited continent might still be present there.

On Easter Sunday, April 6, 1722, Easter Island (Rapa Nui) was discovered, and on April 10, crew members, including Carl, landed there. The search for the continent continued, but nothing other than small islands was found. One of the ships was wrecked. The sea journey westward continued with great difficulty. Nearly half of the crew perished. The journey ended in Batavia, the area where the Dutch East India Company held power. Roggeveen was captured and could only return to the Netherlands with the remaining crew after lengthy negotiations and without great loss of face.

Carl also fell ill but survived the adventure. Although there was much interest in travel descriptions at that time, relatively little was published in the Netherlands about this expedition in the 18th century, especially not by participants. Carl Friedrich first published his account in verse (in German) in 1728. He still believed that an inhabited continent existed and made an attempt in the same year to persuade the VOC to undertake a new expedition. He joined the VOC and departed for Batavia. In 1732, he was already back in Amsterdam and wrote a kind of report titled Nader onderzoek door Karel Fredrik Behrens en bericht van zyne reyze naar Zuyd-Landen gedaan (Further investigation by Karel Fredrik Behrens and report of his journey to South Lands). This is not a real travel report but a document to persuade the VOC of the utility of an expedition. This was not pursued. In 1737, he came up with a prose travel narrative. This work was a great success, translated into French and from French into English. This book was for a long time the most extensive printed document authored by a participant. After his adventures, Behrens settled as a gingerbread baker in Nuremberg.
