= Coral reef restoration =

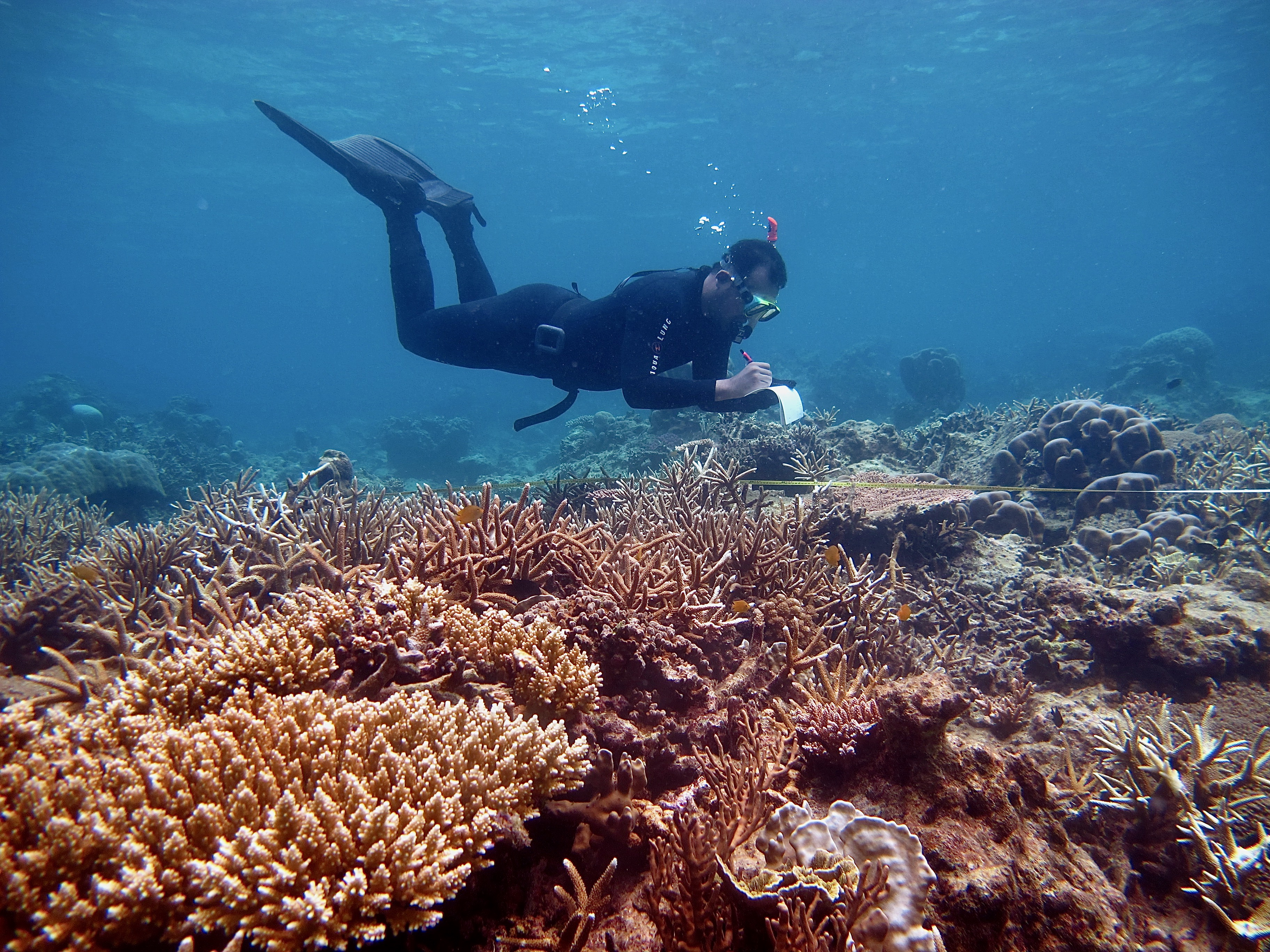
A science dive on coral reefs in Karimunjawa

Coral reef restoration involves natural and anthropogenic processes to restore damaged coral reefs. Reefs suffer damage from natural and man-made causes. Restoration efforts attempt to rectify the damage and restore the reefs. This involves fragmenting mature corals, placing the fragments on lines or supports, nurturing the fragments as they recover and grow, and transplantation of the pieces into their final positions on the reef when they are large enough. Strategies take many different forms, through both marine- and land based-methods. Additionally both sexual and asexual reproduction can be involved. These methods raise concerns relating to the risk of potentially invasive species that may negatively impact ecosystem biodiversity.

With the help of US NOAA, over 40,000 coral reefs have been restored throughout the Caribbean region as of 2021.

== Background ==
Over 25% of marine life lives in coral reef ecosystems. Coral reefs are important buffers between land and ocean and reduce storm damage and coastal erosion. They provide employment, recreational opportunities and are a major source of food for coastal communities. Reef tourism is one of the biggest drivers of economic activity in coastal communities around the globe. Additionally, reefs are a major carbon sink and play an important role in carbon sequestration. Coral reefs also provide communities job opportunities. It is estimated that $375 billion annually comes from coral reef ecosystem services. Coral reefs in the United States account for nearly $3.6 billion of economic output. Coral reefs contribute an estimated $9.9 trillion of economic output a year globally.

=== Coral ===
The most prevalent tropical reef corals are the stony corals (Scleractinia) that build hard skeletons of calcium carbonate which provide protection and structure. Coral polyps have a mutualistic relationship with single-celled algae referred to as zooxanthellae. These algae live in the tissue of coral polyps and provide energy to the coral through photosynthesis. In turn, the coral provides shelter and nutrients to the zooxanthellae. A study showed that about 655 million people live close to coral reefs, accounting for 9% of the global population.

==== Asexual reproduction ====
Coral are able to reproduce asexually when one polyp undergoes budding to produce another clonal polyp.

==== Sexual reproduction ====
In tanks or at sea, coral reproduce sexually through broadcast spawning. Coral larvae are formed in the water column through the fertilization of suspended gamete bundles.

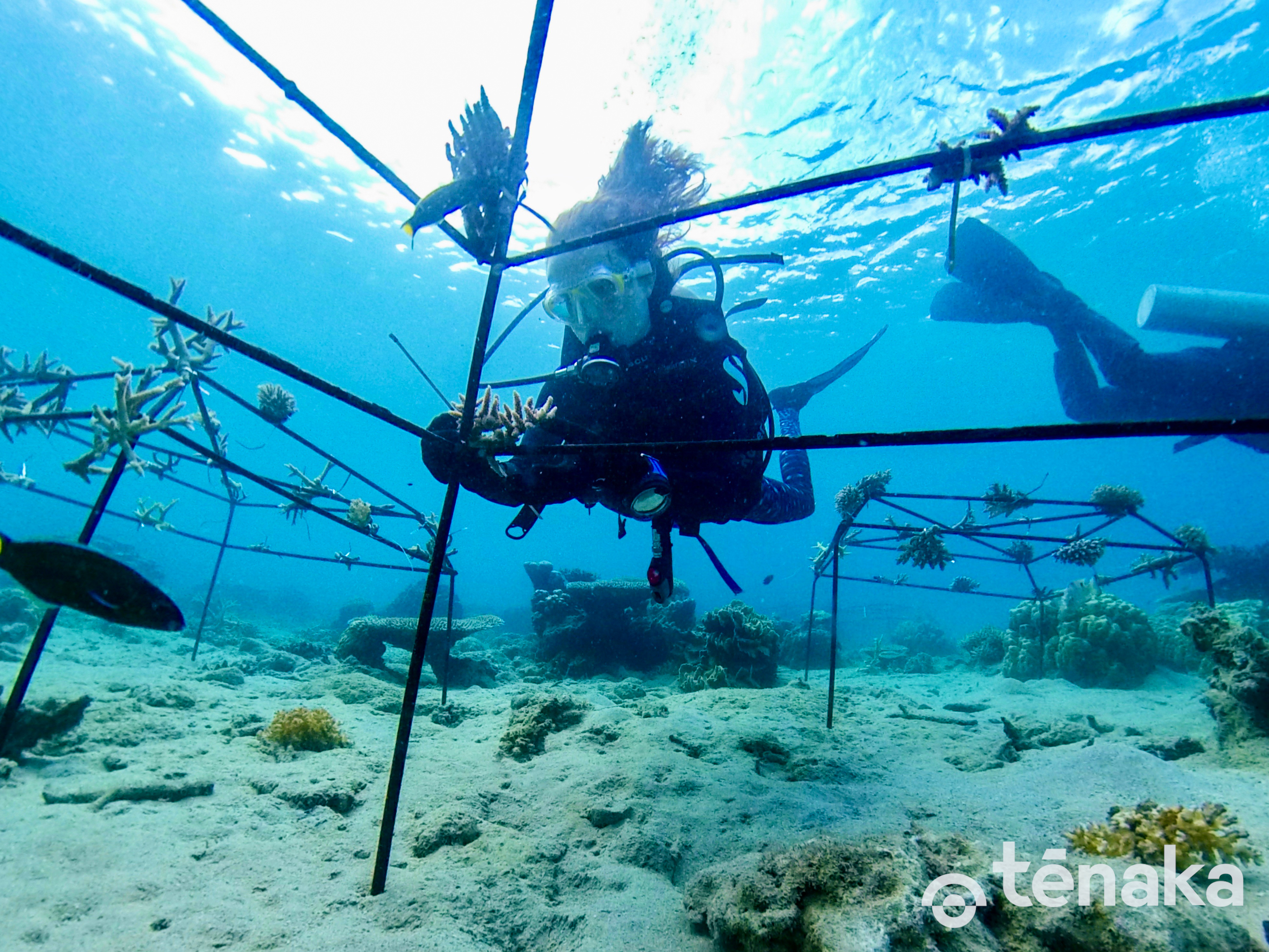
Artificial coral reef trees designed to grow coral.

=== Restoration ===
Coral restoration is one approach to ensure their continued existence. Fragmentation is the most common strategy for restoring reefs; often used to establish artificial reefs such as coral trees, line nurseries, and fixed structures.

== Threats to coral reefs ==
Half the world's coral have disappeared since 1970, and all reefs are threatened with extinction by 2050.

Some anthropogenic activities, such as coral mining, bottom trawling, canal digging, and blast fishing, disrupt coral reefs by damaging the corals' hard calcium carbonate skeletal structure.

Another major threat to coral reefs comes from chemical pollution. Marine pollution from sunscreen, paint, and inland mining can introduce chemicals that are toxic to corals, leading to their decay. Coral disease is often prevalent in areas where coral are stressed and has increased in severity. Eutrophication can occur, limiting nutrients. Deforestation, mining, and agricultural runoff, can add sediment to the water column. Such sediment loading can smother the coral, or block sunlight, effectively preventing the algae from photosynthesizing the energy the coral requires.

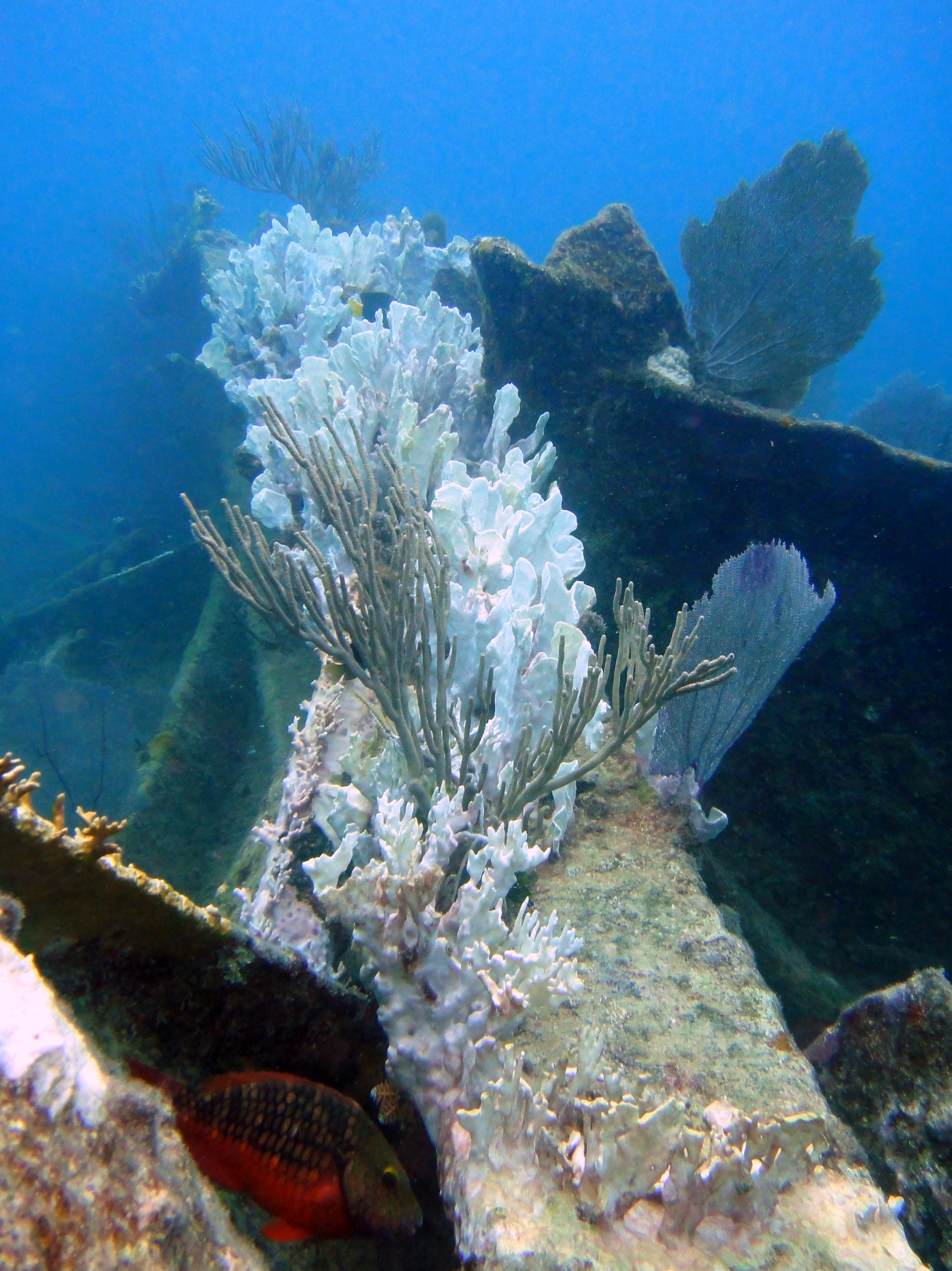
An image of coral bleaching in Key Largo.

Increased CO_{2} emissions from human activities such as fossil fuel burning can effect ocean water pH. Ocean acidification occurs when excess CO_{2} reacts with seawater and lowers the pH. Under acidic conditions, corals cannot produce their calcium carbonate skeletons, and certain zooxanthellae are not able to survive.

Perhaps the biggest threat to coral reefs comes from rising ocean temperatures. Most corals can tolerate only a 4–5 °C (39–41 °F) range in temperature. Under these adverse conditions, corals may expel their zooxanthellae, causing them to turn white (bleach) and die if conditions do not quickly return to normal. One study of the Great Barrier Reef found the reef mortality rate to be 50% after an extreme heatwave with a 3–4 °C (37–39 °F) temperature increase. Injured corals continue to die after a bleach event due to increased disease susceptibility, it can take decades after bleaching events for the reef to recover, and slow-growing corals face severe stress.

== Restoration ==
Land coral nursery in the Chico Mendes Institute for Biodiversity Conservation (ICMBio) in Tamandaré, Pernambuco, Brazil. A large vat contains running water in which many small coral colonies grow.

The process of cultivating coral polyps is known as coral gardening. Growing small coral fragments through asexual reproduction until they are fully mature is the fundamental technique of coral gardening, with ocean-based or land-based nurseries being the two primary methods utilized.

Fragmentation involves dividing a wild coral colony (an attached group of genetically identical group of polyps) into smaller pieces. These smaller pieces are grown asexually into additional colonies. These fragmented colonies are genetically identical to the host colony. Up to 75% of the host colony may be removed without negative effect on its growth rate. This allows researchers to move forward with restoration projects with minimal impact, if any at all, on the growth rate or survivorship of the original colony. Fragmentation practices are used in virtually every kind of coral restoration strategy used today. Several different methods of growing fragmented corals are outlined below.

=== Collection ===
Some collection systems rely on cutting pieces from a healthy colony. Another approach is to gather pieces of coral that a storm or other disturbance broke off from a healthy colony. These pieces are pushed around by surf and quickly expire. Gathering them has no effect on the remnant colonies, but also provides micro-fragmentation candidates.

=== Marine-based ===
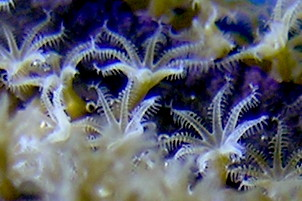
Coral polyps

Ocean-based nurseries involve growing coral fragments underwater, attaching them to structures and monitoring their growth until they reach maturity as new colonies. Once mature, the colonies can be transferred to damaged reefs.

Fragmentation allows for about an 8x increase in reproduction (colony growh) compared to that of the donor coral. The degree of fragmentation is based on the amount of space available for attachment.

Fragmentation should be avoided when risk for disease and storms are high as it increases the risks from these stressors. This strategy may not be optimal for species that are less resilient to fragmentation or that have slower growth rates.

No differences in growth rates have been document between fixed and line nurseries. However, a 2008 study reported that fixed structure nurseries had a 43% survival rate, while line nurseries had a 100% survival rate.

==== Line nursery ====
In vertical line nurseries, coral fragments are tied to a line suspended in the water. One end of the line is attached to a buoy while the other is anchored to the seafloor. The corals in this type of nursery are linked directly to the vertical line in the water column.

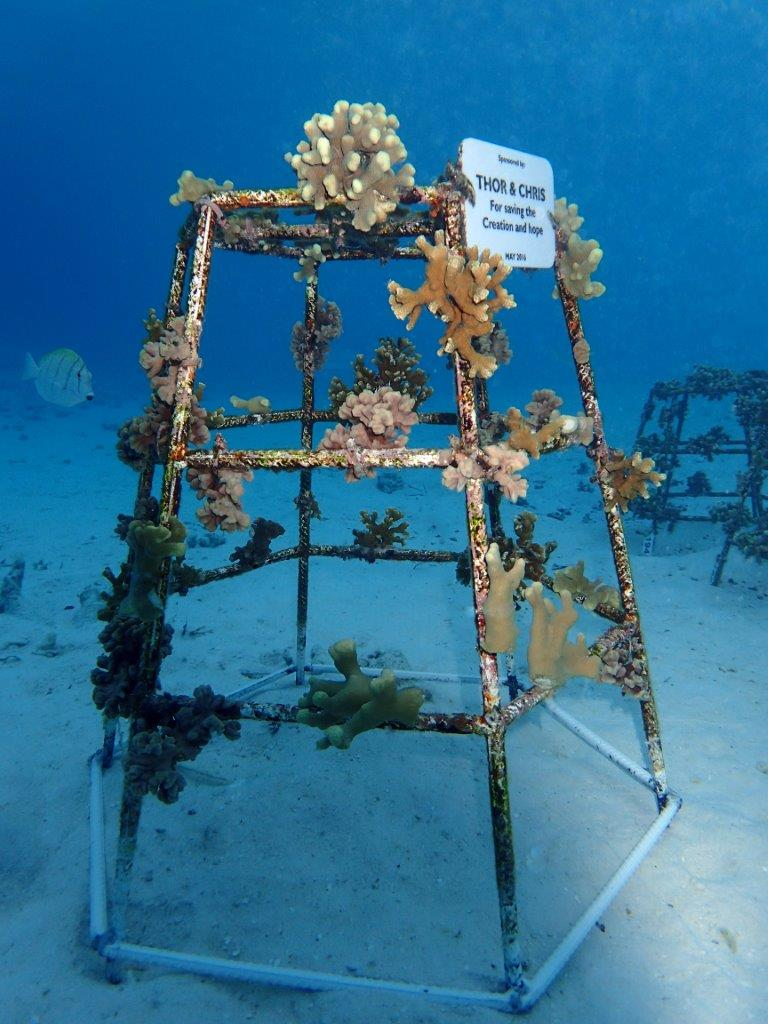
Planted corals near the Maldives island

In suspended line nurseries, two vertical line nurseries are placed apart from each other so they are parallel vertically in the water column. They are then connected together with rope tied perpendicularly between the two. Fragments are then attached to this rope, but dangle off the line so there is less contact with the rope itself. This reduces the mortality of the fragments.Studies report high survival rates of the nursery as a whole (in both vertical and suspended configurations). Line structures increase the distance between the fragments and predators, benthic disease, and compete less for space. Line nursery corals are moved to fixed substrates after an initial growth period.

==== Structure nursery ====
Fixed structure nurseries are attached to the seafloor. These nurseries are typically made from materials such as steel, PVC, plastic mesh, or cinder blocks.

Initial mortality of fixed structure nurseries may depend on the time of year that the corals are transplanted. It is important to limit stressors that newly fragmented corals are exposed to.

A coral tree nursery suspends coral in the water column. Low cost and availability of materials make them ideal for propagation. These nurseries are less susceptible to damage from wave action, interact less with benthic predators and disease, and reduce entanglement risk for other marine life (compared to line nurseries). Because these nurseries are anchored only in one place, they minimally impact the seafloor. They are portable and easily transported by one person, and they can be moved if depth becomes an issue.

=== Land-based ===
Land-based nurseries grow coral fragments in tanks on land, which allows micro fragmenting. Since most colonies grow only about one inch per year, faster-growing practices are help accelerate restoration. Additionally, growing colonies on land can protect them from temperature changes, storms, predators, disease, and other problems.

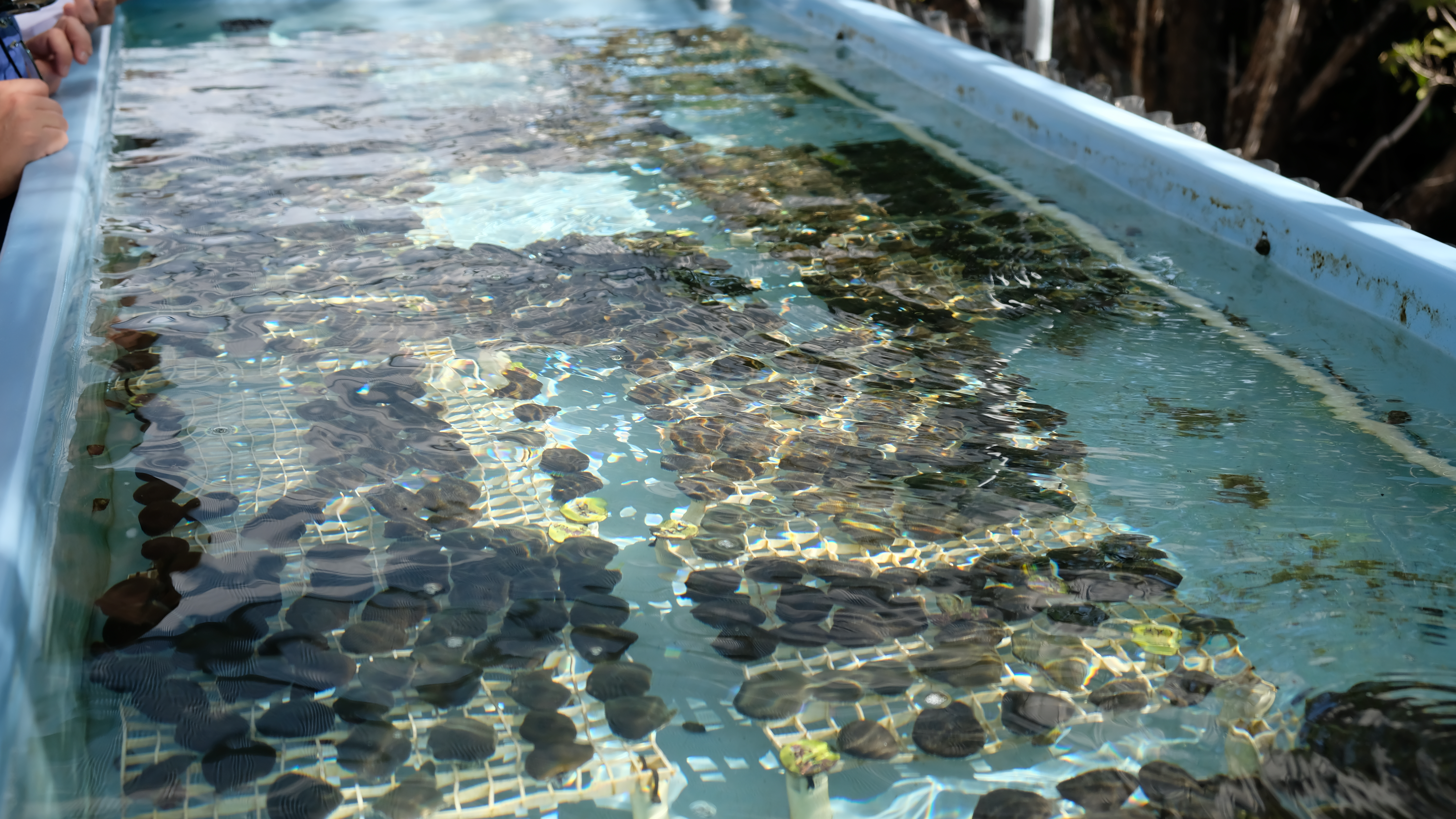
Land-based coral nursery with growing coral micro-fragments

Tanks filled with circulating sea water provide an artificial place for coral seedlings to reproduce. It is also a place to breed for resistant genotypes. Techniques can involve both sexual and asexual reproduction. When used together, coral specimens can be grown with higher resilience to stressors and fast growth rates.

=== Microfragmentation ===
Micro-fragmentation was developed by David Vaughan in 2006. It relies on coral's ability to clone itself. Micro-fragmentation involves cutting small (>1 cm) pieces of live coral from a colony. These pieces are affixed to a ceramic or cement base called a plug and placed in tanks.

Reef-building corals are the prime species for this technique, because micro-fragmentation accelerates their growth from years often to months. In a 2014 study conducted by Vaughan, he reported the growth of Orbicella faveolata and Montastraea cavernosa to be 6.5x and 2x larger respectively over a period of 2.5 years. This amount of growth would take decades without micro-fragmenting. The rapid growth is due to coral's quick healing response. Cutting a colony leaves wounded edges. These heal quickly and expand their size radially outward, expanding across the plug and eventual out-planting site. Adjacent fragments of the same genotype can fuse, producing a larger colony.

==== Selective breeding ====
Availability of coral gametes in the wild is dependent on environmental factors. Most spawning happens at the same time of evening, and follows lunar cycles. Research attempts to trigger coral spawning in the nursery by mimicking these environmental signals. Coral larvae produced through sexual reproduction in the nursery first attach to man-made substrates before they are outplanted. In this way, restoration can start from hybrid larvae rather than clones. In a land-based nursery, stimulated spawning can support selective breeding of more resilient coral.

=== Concerns ===
Pursuing reef restoration through propagation methods comes with potential risks. One concern is that genetic modifications of coral can distort an ecosystem. This may give certain species traits that make them better able to compete for living space. This matches the pattern of invasive species, which can affect other species through direct interactions or indirect consequences. Direct interactions refer to instances of either predation or competition, while indirect consequences refer to instances of disease. Of course, this may also be intentional, given the intent to find/breed more resilient genotypes.

== Approach ==
Coral restoration began in the 1980s. Multiple approaches have been developed. Effectiveness is dependent on the site, how conditions vary, and the structure of the nursery.

Coral gardening, on any scale, may not be able to preserve every species. Instead, restoration can aid natural recovery and the establishment of a larger genetic pool of a species. With protection, corals sexually reproduce and recover naturally with time. Coral gardening and propagation make it much easier for a fragment of coral to survive than it for an early life-stage of coral to establish itself in reef environments.

Creating onshore coral repositories can aid in species reintroduction after bleaching events. These repositories serve as a method for recovery, but they can also deepen the genetic pool. This can increase coral survival rates. One study used an Acropora cervicornis nursery as a repository after an extreme cold-water event occurred that wiped out roughly 43% of its population in the area. These repositories allowed healthy coral colonies to be reintroduced, aiding in natural reproduction.

These practices can be accompanied by practices such as watershed management, sustainable fishing practices, and the establishment of Marine Protected Areas to reduce stressors. Coral gardening also offers indirect benefits, such as the rapid expansion of fish and invertebrate habitat on depleted reefs. These restoration methods also create citizen science opportunities.

== Thermal tolerance ==
Corals that can tolerate increased temperature are a potential resource in coral reef restoration research. Corals from the Persian Gulf often exhibit this capability. Research on these populations has increased over the past decade. These corals can survive summer sea temperatures of around 36 °C, approximately 10 °C higher than typical corals, and survive and recover under high heat conditions through physiological and genetic adaptations. Researchers explore applications for them in coral restoration, such as through selective breeding or transplantation.

Titouan Bernicot utilizes only corals with enhanced thermal tolerance, which he calls "super corals", for his coral reef regrowing.

== See also ==
- Coral reef
- Marine protected area
- Biorock
