= King George Islands =

Archipelago in French Polynesia

Coordinates: 14°32′S 147°08′W

Location of the King George Islands in the Pacific Ocean

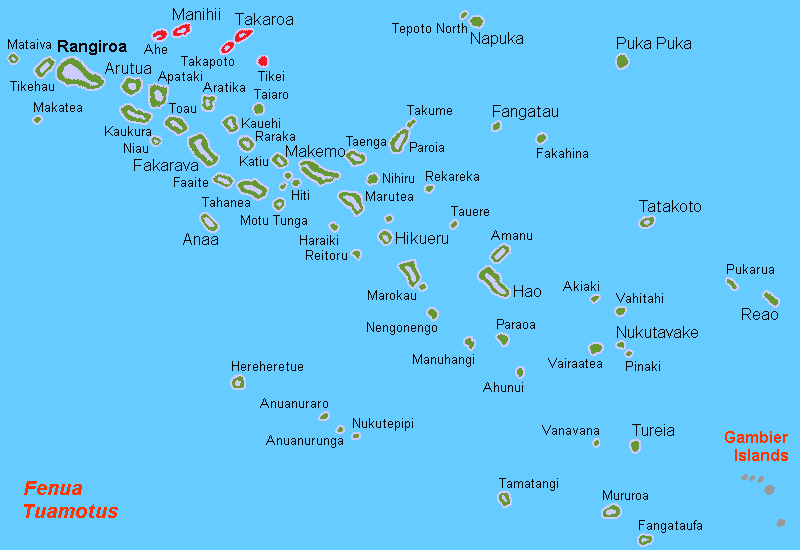
Map of the Tuamotus; the King George Islands are located to the northwest of the main Tuamotu atoll cluster.

The King George Islands (French: Îles du Roi Georges [il dy ʁwa ʒɔʁʒ]) is a subgroup of the Tuamotus Archipelago group in French Polynesia.

The King George Islands include four atolls and one island:

- Ahe
- Manihi
- Takapoto
- Takaroa
- Tikei Island

Tikei is the easternmost island and Ahe Atoll is the westernmost of the subgroup. The distance between them is 200 km (124 mi). Unlike the atolls of the Palliser group that form a spindle from the northwest to the southeast, the King George Islands follow a mirror image pattern of grouping from southwest to the northeast.

== History ==
The name "King George Islands" was given to this group by British explorer John Byron, who reached Manihi, Takaroa and Takapoto in June 1765. In the 1880s, the Tuamotus were claimed by France, and in 1946 the indigenous Polynesians were granted the French citizenship.

== Administration ==
Administratively there are two communes in the King George Islands:

- The commune of Manihi consists of the atolls of Manihi and Ahe.
- The commune of Takaroa consists of the atolls of Takaroa and Takapoto, as well as Tikei Island.
