= Takaroa Airport =

Takaroa Airport Aérodrome de Takaroa
- IATA: TKX; ICAO: NTKR

Summary
- Airport type: Public
- Operator: DSEAC Polynésie Française
- Serves: Takaroa
- Location: Takaroa, Tuamotu, French Polynesia
- Elevation AMSL: 3 m (9.8 ft)
- Coordinates: 14°27′22″S 145°01′35″W

Map
- Location of the airport in French Polynesia

Runways
| Direction | Length | | Surface |
| Direction | m | ft | Surface |
|---|---|---|---|
| 07/25 | 1,050 | 3,445 | Paved |
- Source: French AIP.

Takaroa Airport (IATA: TKX, ICAO: NTKR) is an airport on Takaroa in the Tuamotu in French Polynesia. The airport is 2.5 kilometres (1.6 mi) north of the village.

== Airlines and destinations ==
Air Tahiti connects Takaroa Airport to Faaʼa International Airport (Papeete) and Takapoto Airport.

== See also ==
- List of airports in French Polynesia
