= Taaone Hospital =

Hospital in Pirae, Papeete, French Polynesia

Taaone Hospital Centre Hopitalier du Taaone
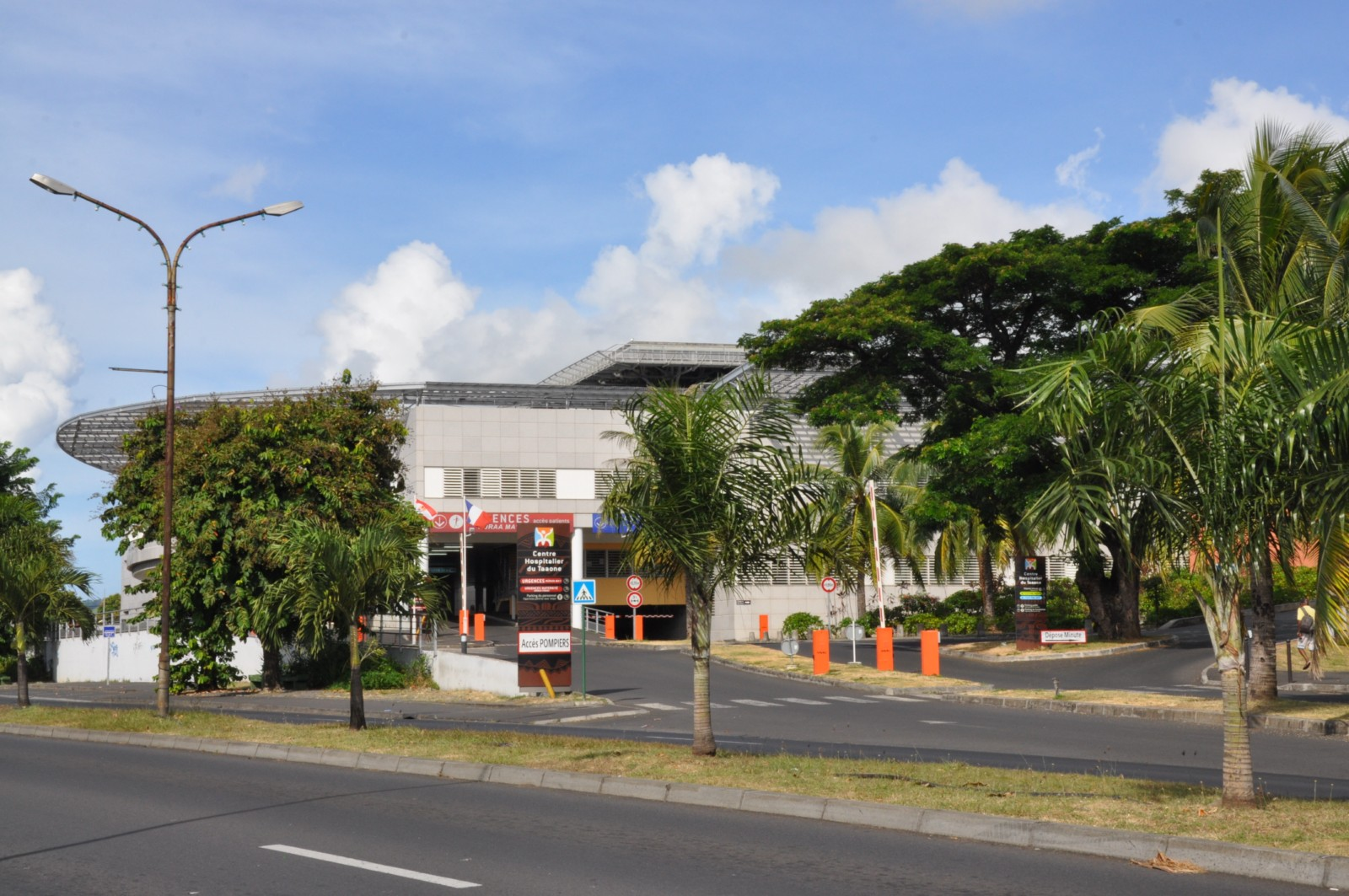

Geography
- Location: Pirae, Papeete, French Polynesia
- Coordinates: 17°31′44.4″S 149°32′47.1″W

Organisation
- Type: public hospital

History
- Founded: 25 October 2010

Links
- Website: Official website (in French)

The Taaone Hospital (CHPF; French: Centre Hopitalier du Taaone) is a public hospital in Pirae, Papeete, French Polynesia.

== History ==
The hospital was officially opened on 25 October 2010. It was constructed with a cost of US$570 million. The hospital has been dealing with COVID-19 patients in 2020–2021. In July 2021, French President Emmanuel Macron paid a visit to the hospital. In August 2021, the hospital appealed to the president for France to send more medical personnel to French Polynesia to deal with the pandemic.

== Architecture ==
The hospital is the largest in the territory.
