= Takapoto =

Atoll in French Polynesia

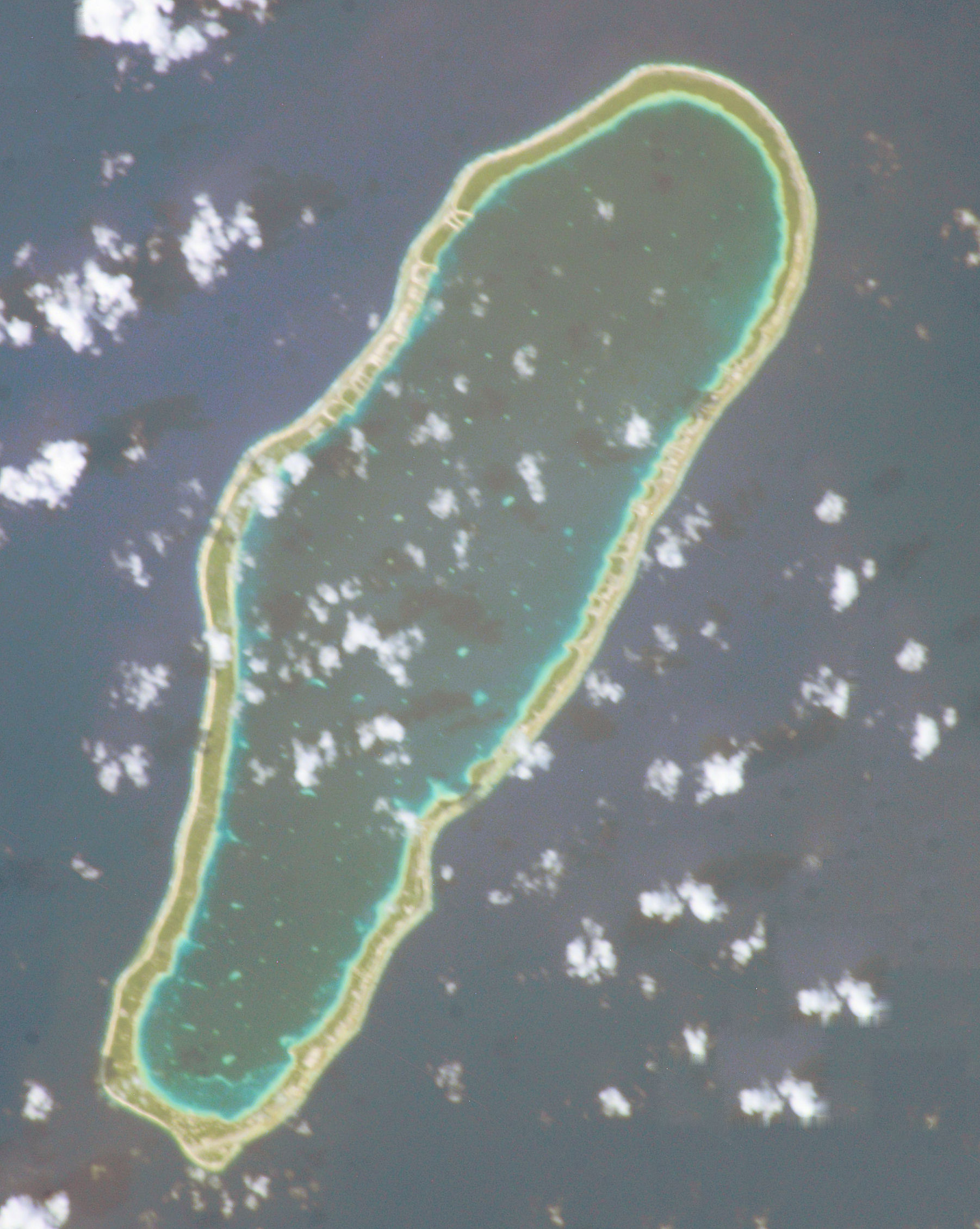
- NASA picture of Takapoto Atoll

- Location within French Polynesia

Geography
- Location: Pacific Ocean
- Coordinates: 14°37′39″S 145°12′18″W
- Archipelago: Tuamotus
- Area: 85 km^{2} (33 sq mi) (lagoon); 15 km^{2} (6 sq mi) (above water)
- Length: 20 km (12 mi)
- Width: 6.7 km (4.16 mi)

Administration
- France
- Overseas collectivity: French Polynesia
- Administrative subdivision: Tuamotus
- Commune: Takaroa
- Largest settlement: Fakatopatere

Demographics
- Population: 380 (2012)

Takapoto, Tua-poto or Oura, is an atoll in the Tuamotu group in French Polynesia. It has a length of 20 kilometres (12 miles) and a width of 6.7 kilometres (4.2 miles).

The nearest land is Takaroa Atoll, located 10 kilometres (6 miles) to the northeast.

Takapoto's lagoon has a high salinity and a strong phytoplankton biomass.

Geographically Takapoto is part of the King George Islands (Iles du Roi Georges) subgroup, which includes: Ahe, Manihi, Takapoto, Takaroa and Tikei.

Takapoto Atoll has 380 inhabitants. Fakatopatere, the main village on Takapoto, is located at the southern end of the atoll.

== History ==
The first recorded European to sight Takapoto Atoll was Jacob Le Maire in 1616. Jacob Roggeveen's flagship Afrikaansche Galey wrecked near the atoll and abandoned in 1722; the incident became a major point in history where Polynesians first acquired knowledge of metals like iron from her scraps broken apart by local islanders not long after.

Takapoto Atoll was visited by the Charles Wilkes expedition in September 1839.

Takapoto Airport was inaugurated in 1973.

== Administration ==
The commune of Takaroa-Takapoto consists of the atolls of Takaroa and Takapoto, and Tikei Island.

== See also ==
- Takapoto Airport
