= Takaroa =

Atoll in French Polynesia

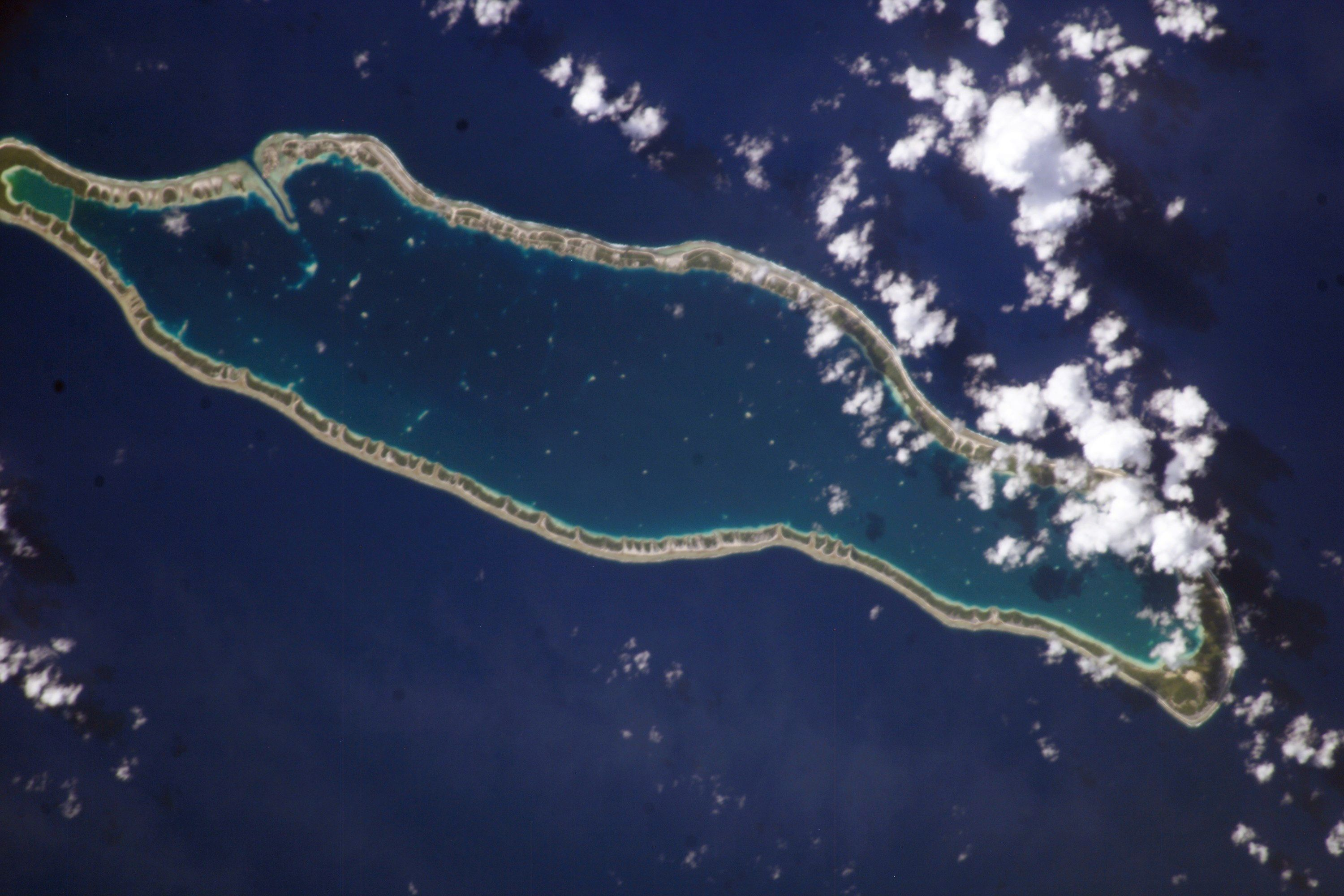
- NASA picture of Takaroa Atoll

- Location within French Polynesia

Geography
- Location: Pacific Ocean
- Coordinates: 14°27′S 144°59′W
- Archipelago: Tuamotus
- Area: 93 km^{2} (36 sq mi) (lagoon); 20 km^{2} (8 sq mi) (above water)
- Length: 24.7 km (15.35 mi)
- Width: 7 km (4.3 mi)

Administration
- France
- Overseas collectivity: French Polynesia
- Administrative subdivision: Îles Tuamotu-Gambier
- Commune: Takaroa
- Largest settlement: Teavaroa

Demographics
- Population: 537 (2022)

Takaroa
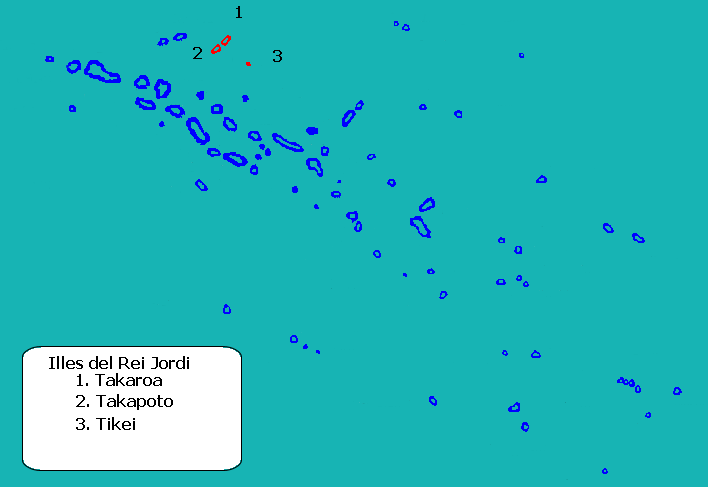
- Location of Takaroa
- Coordinates: 14°27′00″S 144°58′59″W
- Country: France
- Overseas collectivity: French Polynesia
- Subdivision: Îles Tuamotu-Gambier
- Area^{1}: 26 km^{2} (10 sq mi)
- Elevation: 0 m (0 ft)
- Population (2022): 1,050
  - Density: 40/km^{2} (100/sq mi)
- Time zone: UTC−10:00
- INSEE/Postal code: 98749 /98781
- ^{1} French Land Register data, which excludes lakes, ponds, glaciers > 1 km^{2} (0.386 sq mi or 247 acres) and river estuaries.

Takaroa, Taka-roa or Takapua, is an atoll in the Tuamotu group in French Polynesia. It is 27.4 kilometres (17.0 miles) long and 7 km (4 mi) wide; its land area is 20 square kilometres (8 square miles).

The nearest land is Takapoto Atoll, located 10 kilometres (6 miles) to the southwest.

Fine pearls, including black pearls, were obtained in the lagoon of Takaroa.

Geographically, Takaroa is part of the King George Islands (Iles du Roi Georges) subgroup, which includes Ahe, Manihi, Takapoto, Takaroa and Tikei.

Takaroa Atoll has 537 inhabitants (2022). The main village is Teavaroa.

Takaroa is the northernmost atoll in French Polynesia.

Takaroa is located in the Tuamotu Islands.

== History ==
The first recorded Europeans to visit Takaroa were the Dutch explorers Jacob le Maire and Willem Schouten, who arrived on 14 April 1616 during their Pacific journey. They called this atoll "Sondergrond Island".

Captain Cook visited the island in 1774.

Takaroa territorial airport was inaugurated in 1986.

== Geography ==
=== Climate ===
Takaroa has a tropical rainforest climate (Köppen Af), bordering upon a tropical monsoon climate (Am). The average annual temperature in Takaroa is 27.9 °C (82.2 °F). The average annual rainfall is 1,528.6 mm (60.18 in) with December as the wettest month. The temperatures are highest on average in March, at around 28.8 °C (83.8 °F), and lowest in August, at around 26.7 °C (80.1 °F). The hottest temperature ever recorded in Takaroa was 35.6 °C (96.1 °F) on 20 January 1998; the coolest being 19.5 °C (67.1 °F) on 10 January 1976.

Climate data for Takaroa (1991–2020 averages, extremes 1951−present)
Month	Jan	Feb	Mar	Apr	May	Jun	Jul	Aug	Sep	Oct	Nov	Dec	Year
Record high °C (°F)	35.6 (96.1)	35.3 (95.5)	35.0 (95.0)	33.5 (92.3)	33.8 (92.8)	33.3 (91.9)	31.6 (88.9)	32.1 (89.8)	31.9 (89.4)	33.0 (91.4)	33.0 (91.4)	33.8 (92.8)	35.6 (96.1)
Mean daily maximum °C (°F)	30.7 (87.3)	30.8 (87.4)	31.1 (88.0)	31.0 (87.8)	30.4 (86.7)	29.5 (85.1)	28.9 (84.0)	28.8 (83.8)	29.1 (84.4)	29.7 (85.5)	30.3 (86.5)	30.5 (86.9)	30.1 (86.2)
Daily mean °C (°F)	28.3 (82.9)	28.4 (83.1)	28.8 (83.8)	28.8 (83.8)	28.3 (82.9)	27.5 (81.5)	27.0 (80.6)	26.7 (80.1)	27.0 (80.6)	27.4 (81.3)	27.9 (82.2)	28.1 (82.6)	27.9 (82.2)
Mean daily minimum °C (°F)	25.8 (78.4)	26.0 (78.8)	26.5 (79.7)	26.5 (79.7)	26.1 (79.0)	25.5 (77.9)	25.0 (77.0)	24.7 (76.5)	24.8 (76.6)	25.1 (77.2)	25.5 (77.9)	25.6 (78.1)	25.6 (78.1)
Record low °C (°F)	19.5 (67.1)	20.9 (69.6)	21.6 (70.9)	21.3 (70.3)	21.2 (70.2)	20.2 (68.4)	20.0 (68.0)	20.9 (69.6)	20.6 (69.1)	20.3 (68.5)	20.9 (69.6)	20.7 (69.3)	19.5 (67.1)
Average rainfall mm (inches)	197.4 (7.77)	170.9 (6.73)	128.6 (5.06)	115.9 (4.56)	109.6 (4.31)	92.6 (3.65)	65.1 (2.56)	65.9 (2.59)	83.3 (3.28)	121.7 (4.79)	158.5 (6.24)	219.1 (8.63)	1,528.6 (60.18)
Average rainy days (≥ 1.0 mm)	16.3	14.5	13.3	10.9	11.4	11.0	10.4	9.4	10.0	12.3	14.7	15.5	149.7
Mean monthly sunshine hours	223.4	212.9	238.5	233.9	223.5	—	—	—	—	—	—	213.1	—
Source 1: Météo-France
Source 2: Meteociel (sunshine 1981-2010)

== Administration ==
The commune of Takaroa consists of the islands of Takaroa, Takapoto and Tikei.

== See also ==
- Takaroa Airport
