= Titouan Bernicot =

French Polynesian environmentalist

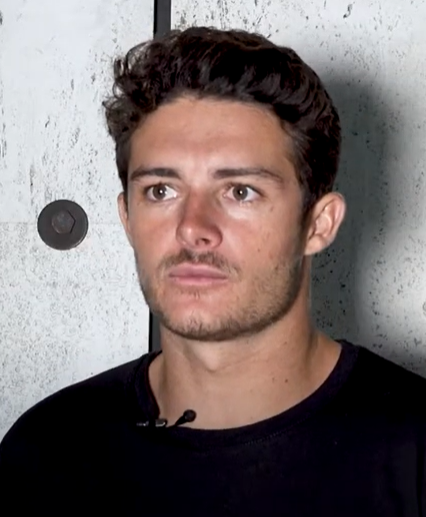
- Bernicot in 2021
- Born: Ahe, French Polynesia
- Occupations: Environmental activist; Coral gardener
- Organization: Founder of Coral Gardeners
- Awards: Time 100 Climate 2025, Forbes 30 under 30 Europe 2026

Titouan Bernicot is a French Polynesian environmentalist and environmental activist. He is best known for founding Coral Gardeners, a group focused on regrowing coral reefs. He was named to the Forbes 30 under 30 in Europe in 2026 and to the Time 100 Climate in 2025.

== Biography ==
He was born in 1998 or 1999. He has stated he was born on a pearl farm in a tiny coral atoll, Ahe, in the Tuamotus in French Polynesia. Beginning when he was little, he enjoyed swimming, and often swam with sharks. At the age of three, his family moved to Moʼorea due to the lack of schooling on Ahe. He grew up spearfishing, diving, and surfing, and was also a photographer. At 16, he, together with two friends, bought a boat. They decided to go out surfing, but discovered the coral bleached and disintegrating. He subsequently began researching coral bleaching.

He began doing coral reef restoration, taking and replanting coral cuttings. After dropping out of university in France, he returned to his island, and ultimately, in 2017, decided to create an organization, Coral Gardeners, to do coral planting: the two friends who previously discovered coral bleaching with him became the first two members. As of 2026, the organization had 80 members.

The organization, under his leadership, grows super corals, which are more resilient to climate change-caused conditions, in a nursery, before planting them in damaged coral reefs. They utilize recycled items from abandoned pearl farms to build their nurseries. They also have an in-house research lab creating apps, robots, and an artificial intelligence program. In addition to working in French Polynesia, he has also initiated a project in Thailand and one in Fiji, where Chris Hemsworth and Matt Damon participated. One of the main aspects of their business model is an "adopt-a-coral" program.

He has partnered with Apple Inc., the Hugo Boss Foundation, Rolex through their Perpetual Planet initiative, the National Geographic, who has provided grants, and Prada, who announced they would be seeking to expand Coral Gardeners to the Mediterranean and has also collaborated on an educational model. He also has advertised Coral Gardeners through a campaign starring Bailey Bass and also been supported by Sylvia Earle.

He spoke in the United Nations–sponsored Young Activists Summit in 2021. He collaborated with North Sails for their Spring/Summer 2023 collection and has also partnered with Billabong for a clothing collection. He was named a Voice of Now by Harper's Bazaar in 2023. He was named to the Time 100 Climate in 2025 and to the Forbes 30 Under 30 Europe in 2026. He is a National Geographic Explorer.
