= Takapoto Airport =

Airport in French Polynesia

- IATA: TKP; ICAO: NTGT

Summary
- Location: Takapoto, French Polynesia
- Elevation AMSL: 12 ft (3.7 m)
- Coordinates: 14°42′36″S 145°14′52″W

Map
- Location in French Polynesia

Runways
Direction	Length		Surface
Direction	m	ft	Surface
07/25	920	3,018

Takapoto Airport is an airport on Takapoto in French Polynesia (IATA: TKP, ICAO: NTGT). The airport is south of the village of Fakatopatere. It was constructed in 1973.

== Airlines and destinations ==
Air Tahiti connects Takapoto Airport to Faaʼa International Airport (Papeete) and Takaroa Airport.

== See also ==
- List of airports in French Polynesia
