= Ahe =

Atoll in French Polynesia

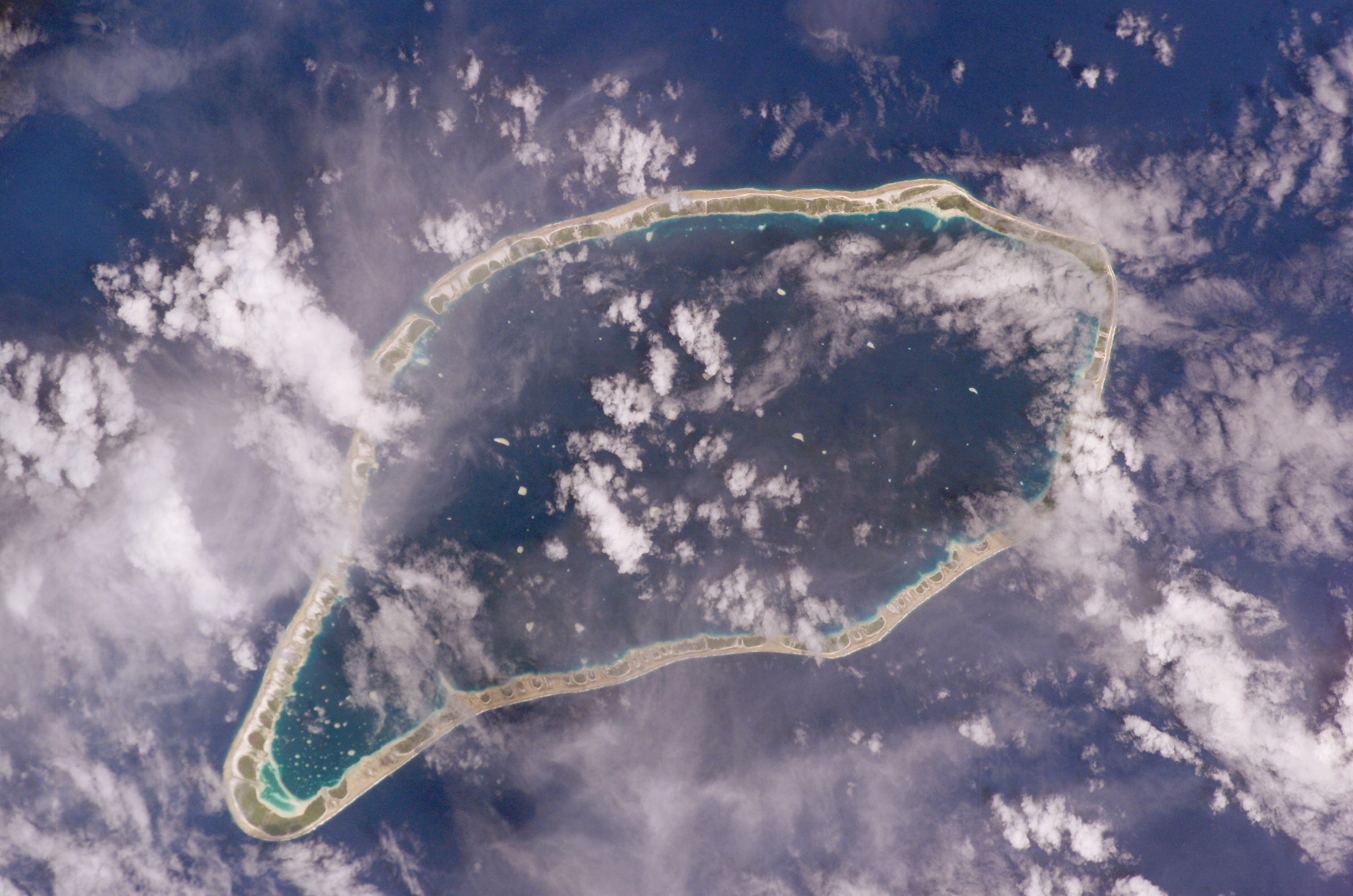
- NASA picture of Ahe Atoll

- Location within French Polynesia

Geography
- Location: Pacific Ocean
- Coordinates: 14°29′S 146°19′W
- Archipelago: Tuamotus
- Area: 138 km^{2} (53 sq mi)(lagoon); 12 km^{2} (5 sq mi) (above water)
- Length: 23.5 km (14.6 mi)
- Width: 12.2 km (7.58 mi)
- Highest elevation: 10 m (30 ft)
- Highest point: (unnamed)

Administration
- France
- Overseas collectivity: French Polynesia
- Administrative subdivision: Tuamotus
- Commune: Manihi
- Largest settlement: Tenukupara (pop. 100)

Demographics
- Population: 552 (2012)
- Pop. density: 47/km^{2} (122/sq mi)

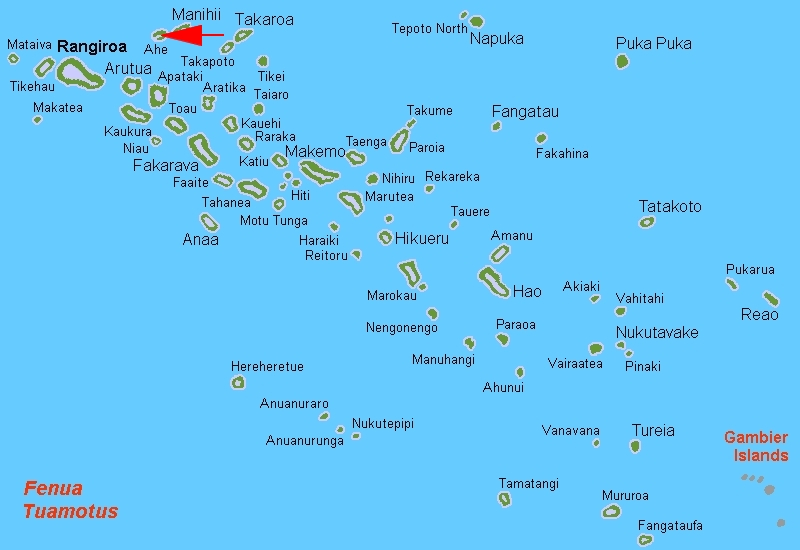
Location of Ahe Atoll

Ahe, Ahemaru or Omaru, is a coral atoll in the northern Tuamotu Archipelago, 14 km to the west of Manihi, in French Polynesia. Its ring shape is broken by only a single small passage into the lagoon. It has a land area of approximately 12 km^{2} and a lagoon area of 138 km^{2}. As of 2012, Ahe Atoll had 553 inhabitants. The only village in Ahe is Tenukupara with approximately 100 inhabitants. It is located on an island in the south side of the Atoll.

The Atoll is part of the King George Islands (Iles du Roi Georges) subgroup, which includes Ahe, Manihi, Takapoto, Takaroa and Tikei. There are several pearl farms in Ahe's lagoon.

== History ==
The first recorded Europeans to arrive to Ahe Atoll were Dutch mariners Willem Schouten and Jacob Le Maire in 1616. Ahe was later visited by the United States Exploring Expedition, 1838–1842. Charles Wilkes called the atoll "Peacock Island" after one of the ships of the expedition. This atoll has sometimes suffered damage caused by cyclones.

In the late 1970s, sailor Bernard Moitessier lived on Ahe for two years.

== Demographics ==
Population of Ahe:

1977	1983	1988	1996	2002	2007	2012
109	142	162	377	441	566	552
Sources ISPF, Mairie de Ahe * : estimation

== Administration ==
Ahe Atoll belongs to the commune of Manihi, which consists of the atolls of Manihi and Ahe.

== People ==
Notable people affiliated with Ahe include Titouan Bernicot.

== See also ==
- Ahe Airport
