= Jacob Roggeveen =

Dutch explorer of the Pacific Ocean (1659–1729)

- Born: 1 February 1659; Middelburg
- Died: 31 January 1729 (aged 69); Middelburg
- Other names: Roggewein, Commodore
- Education: University of Harderwijk
- Employer: Dutch West India Company
- Spouse(s): Marija Margaerita Vincentius, Anna Adriana Clement
- Parent(s): Arend Roggeveen, Maria Storm

Jacob Roggeveen (1 February 1659 – 31 January 1729) was a Dutch explorer who was sent to find Terra Australis and Davis Land, but instead found Easter Island (called so because he landed there on Easter Sunday). Jacob Roggeveen was the first European to find Bora Bora and Maupiti of the Society Islands, as well as Samoa. He planned the expedition along with his brother Jan Roggeveen, who stayed in the Netherlands.

== Early career ==
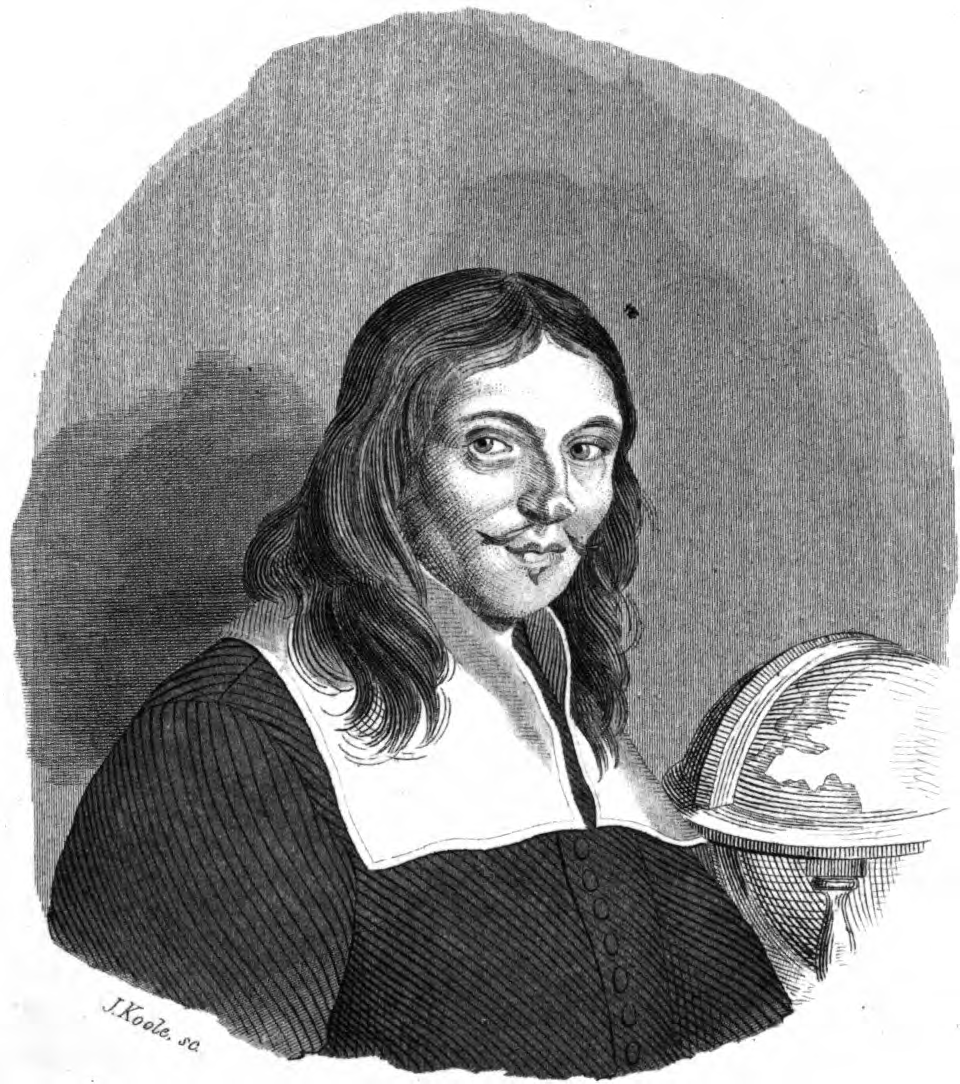
Arend Roggeveen, the father of Jacob

His father, Arend Roggeveen, was a mathematician with much knowledge of astronomy, geography, rhetoric, philosophy, and the theory of navigation. He occupied himself with study of the mythical Terra Australis, and even got a patent for an exploratory excursion, but it was to be his son who, at the age of 62, eventually equipped three ships and made the expedition.

He became notary of Middelburg (the capital of the province of Zeeland, where he was born). On 12 August 1690, he graduated as a doctor of the law at the University of Harderwijk. About this time he married Marija Margaerita Vincentius. She died around 3 to 4 years later in October 1694. In 1706, he joined the Dutch East Indies Company (VOC), and between 1707 and 1714 worked as a Raadsheer van Justitie ("Council Lord of Justice") at Batavia, Dutch East Indies (now Jakarta). He married Anna Adriana Clement there, but she died soon afterward. In 1714, he returned to Middelburg by himself.

He became involved in religious controversies, supporting the liberal preacher Pontiaan van Hattem by publishing his leaflet De val van 's werelds afgod (The fall of the world's idol). The first part appeared in 1718 in Middelburg, and was subsequently confiscated by the city council and burned. Roggeveen fled from Middelburg to nearby Flushing. Thereafter he established himself in the small town of Arnemuiden, and published parts 2 and 3 of the series, again raising a controversy.

== Explorations ==
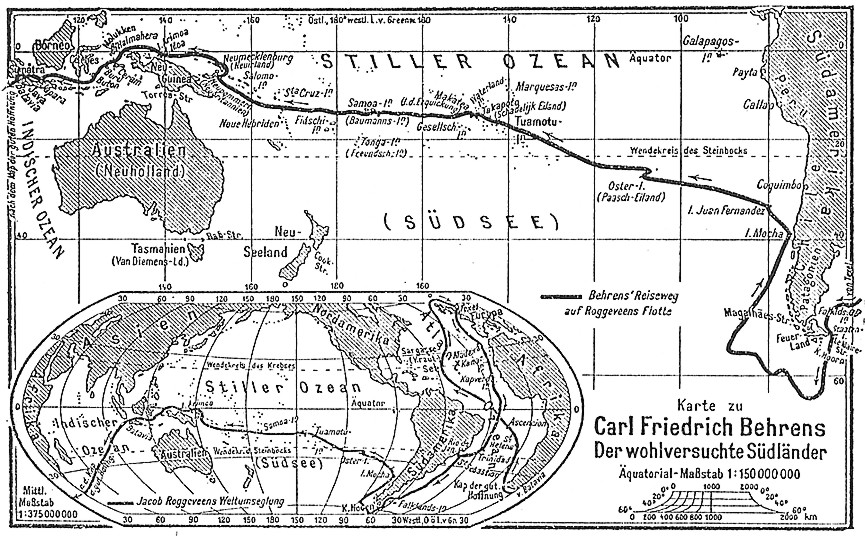
Roggeveen's itinerary

On 1 August 1721 he headed an expedition sponsored by the Dutch West India Company, the rivals of the VOC, to seek Terra Australis and to open a western trade route to the "Spice islands" in the East Indies. His fleet consisted of three ships, the Arend, the Thienhoven, and Afrikaansche Galey and had 223 men on crew.

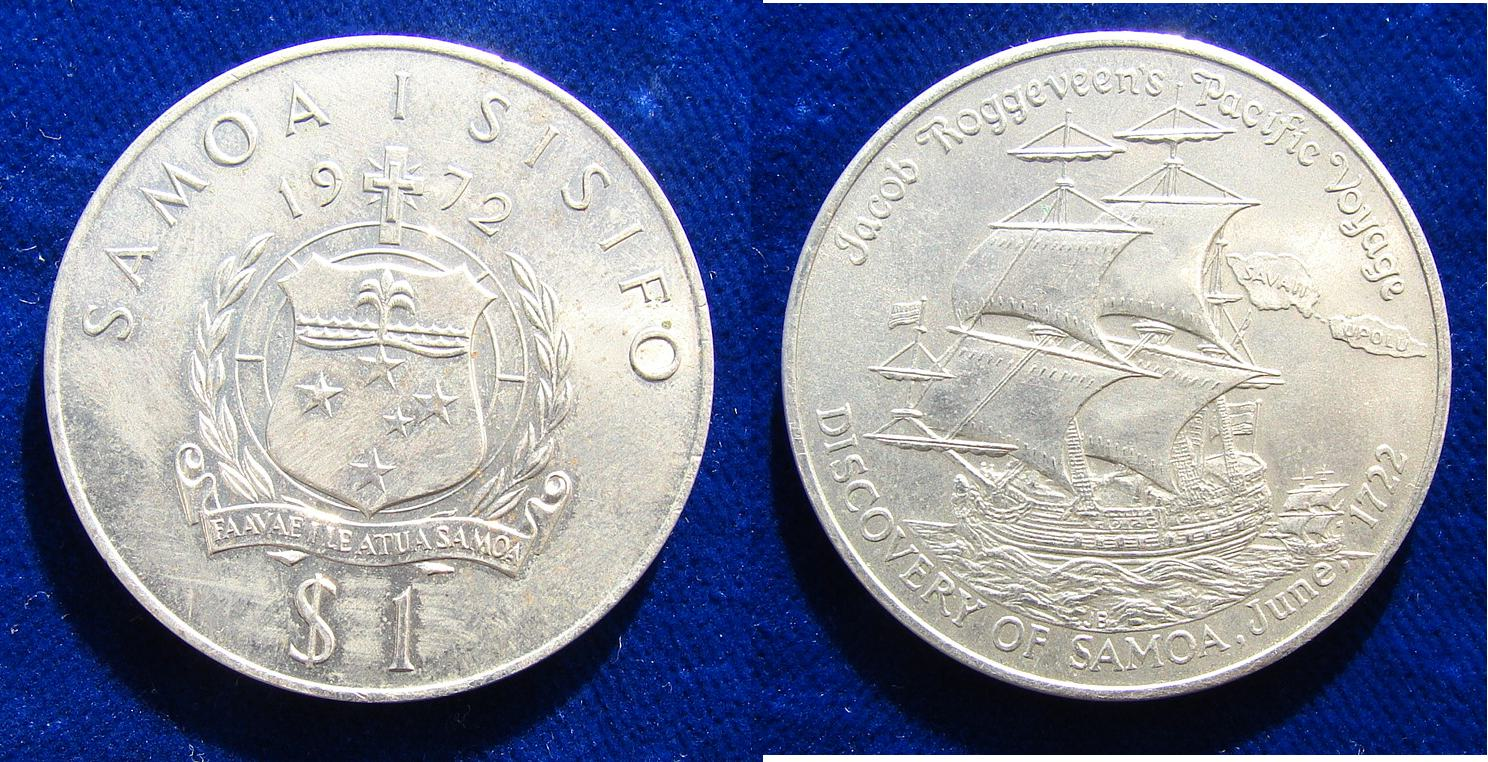
Samoan Commemorative Coin 250 Years Discovery of Samoa by the Dutch Captain Jacob Roggeveen

Roggeveen first sailed down to the Falkland Islands (which he renamed "Belgia Australis"), passed through the Strait of Le Maire, and continued south to beyond 60 degrees south to enter the Pacific Ocean. He made landfall near Valdivia, Chile. He visited the Juan Fernández Islands, where he spent 24 February to 17 March. The expedition later arrived at Easter Island (Rapa Nui) on Easter Sunday, 5 April 1722 (whereupon he reported seeing 2,000–3,000 inhabitants). Roggeveen charted the location of six islands in the Tuamotu Archipelago, two islands in the Society Islands, and four islands in Samoa, losing his flagship, Afrikaansche Galey at Takapoto atoll. At Makatea, he opened fire on a crowded beach in retaliation for a violent encounter with the inhabitants, and in return the Makateans ambushed a shore party, killing ten of his crewmen. The remaining two vessels sailed past New Guinea to reach Batavia in 1722, where he was arrested for violating the monopoly of the VOC and had his ships confiscated. After a lengthy lawsuit in the Netherlands, the VOC was later forced to compensate him for his losses and to pay his crew.

After his return, Roggeveen published part 4 of his work, De val van 's werelds afgod.
