= Manihi =

Atoll in French Polynesia

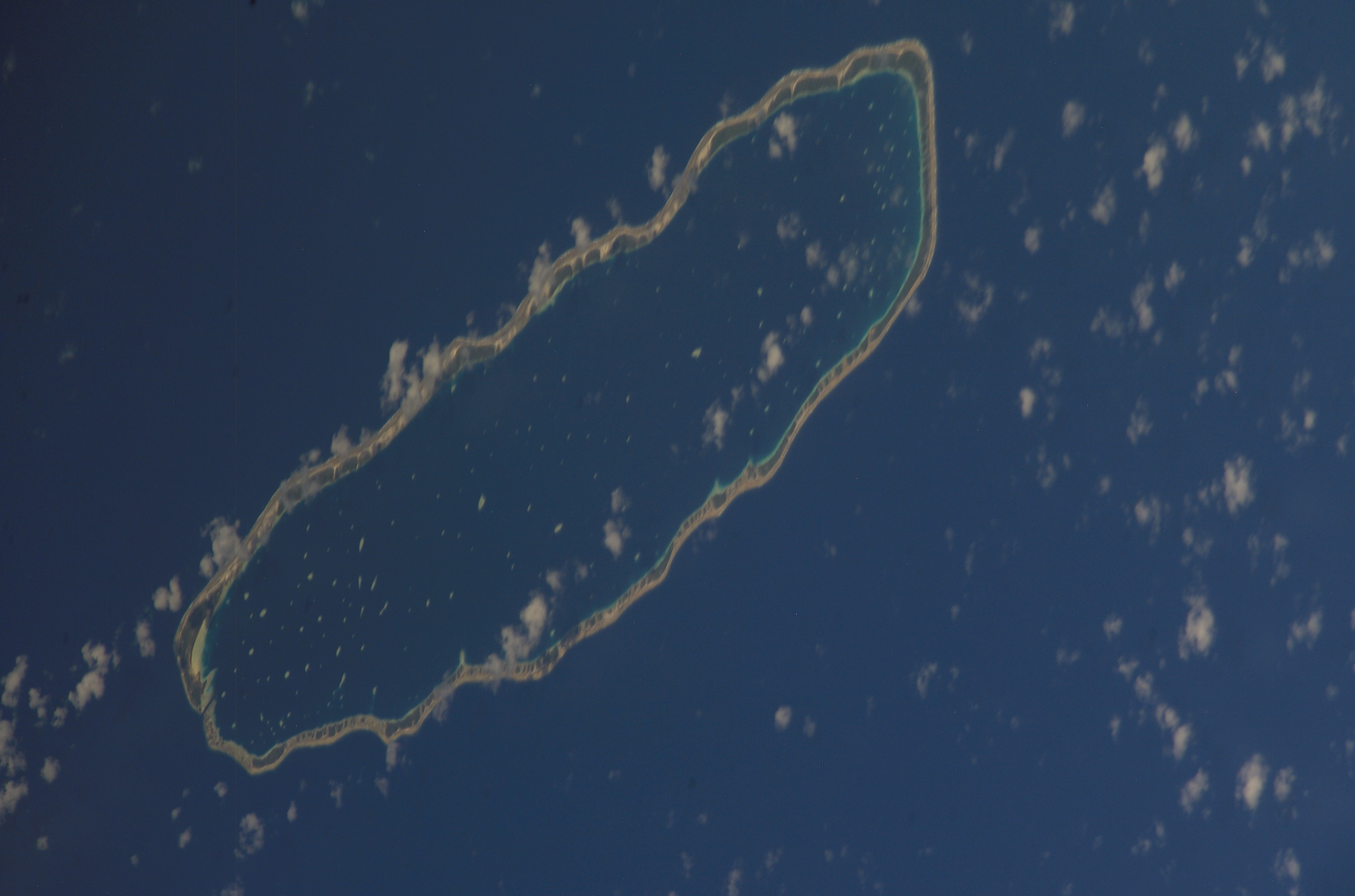
- NASA picture of Manihi Atoll

- Location within French Polynesia

Geography
- Location: Pacific Ocean
- Coordinates: 14°26′31″S 146°04′19″W
- Archipelago: Tuamotus
- Area: 160 km^{2} (62 sq mi) (lagoon); 13 km^{2} (5 sq mi) (above water)
- Length: 27 km (16.8 mi)
- Width: 8 km (5 mi)
- Highest elevation: 9 m (30 ft)
- Highest point: (unnamed)

Administration
- France
- Overseas collectivity: French Polynesia
- Administrative subdivision: Îles Tuamotu-Gambier
- Commune: Manihi
- Capital city: Paeua

Demographics
- Population: 648 (2022)

Manihi
- Commune
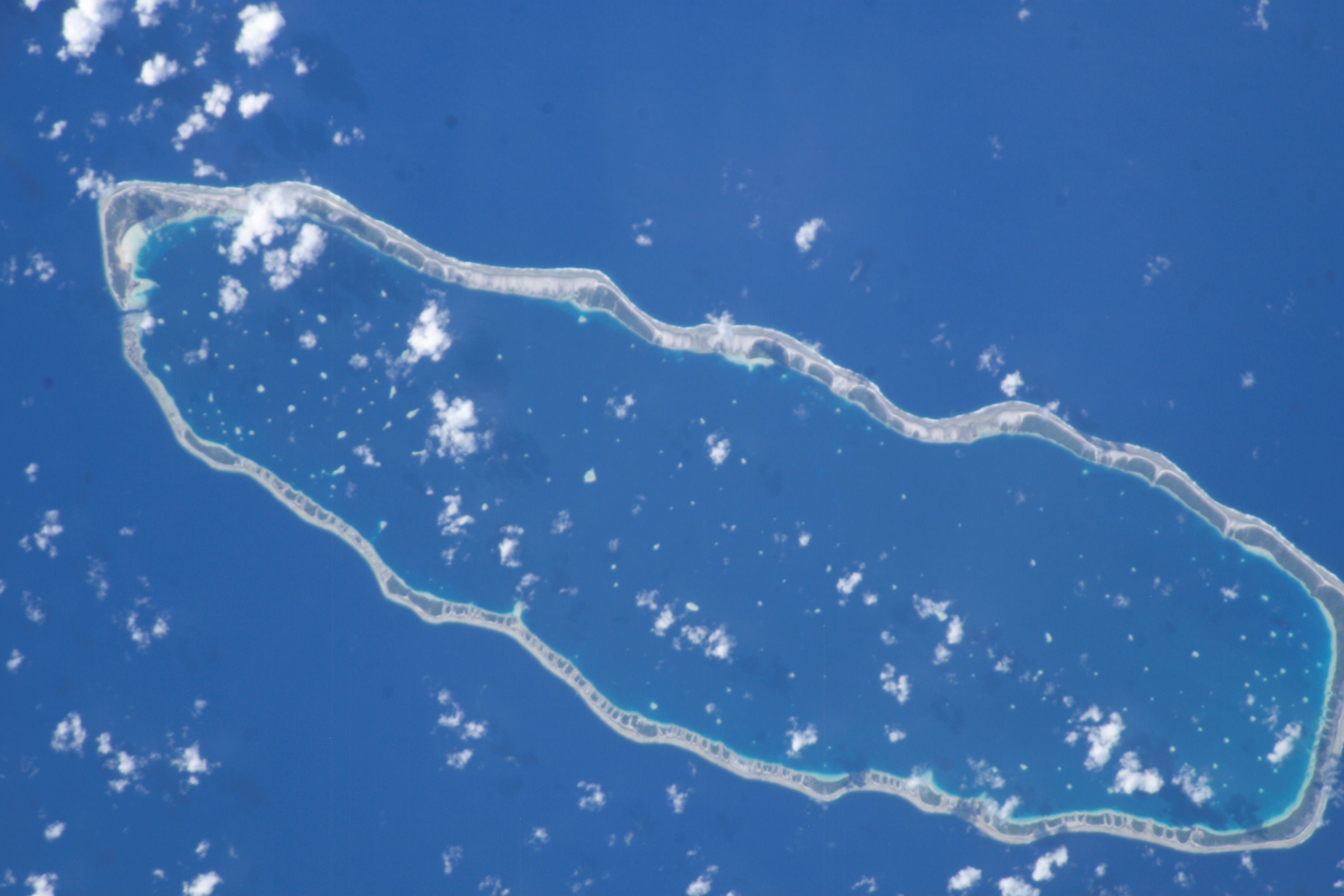
- NASA picture of Manihi Atoll.

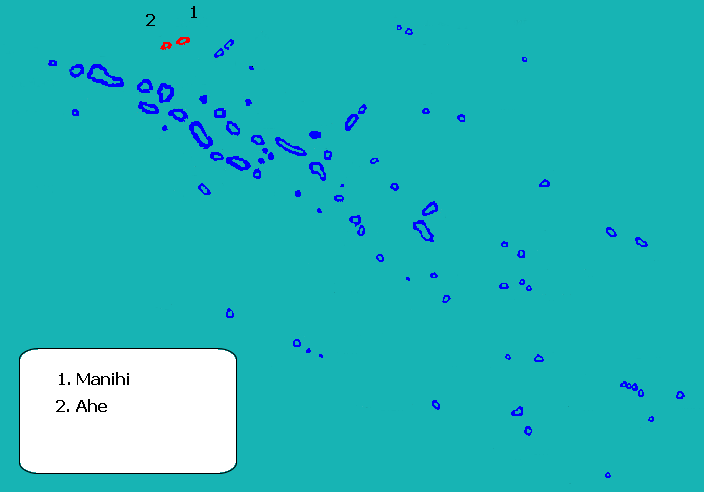
- Location of Manihi
- Coordinates: 14°26′31″S 146°04′19″W
- Country: France
- Overseas collectivity: French Polynesia
- Subdivision: Îles Tuamotu-Gambier

Government
  - Mayor (2020–2026): John Drollet
- Area^{1}: 25 km^{2} (9.7 sq mi)
- Population (2022): 1,138
  - Density: 46/km^{2} (120/sq mi)
- Time zone: UTC−10:00
- INSEE/Postal code: 98727 /98771
- ^{1} French Land Register data, which excludes lakes, ponds, glaciers > 1 km^{2} (0.386 sq mi or 247 acres) and river estuaries.

Manihi, or Paeua, is a coral atoll in the Tuamotu Archipelago, part of French Polynesia. It is one of the northernmost of the Tuamotus, located in the King George subgroup. The closest land to Manihi is Ahe Atoll, located 14 km to the west. The population is 648 inhabitants (2022 census).

== Geography ==
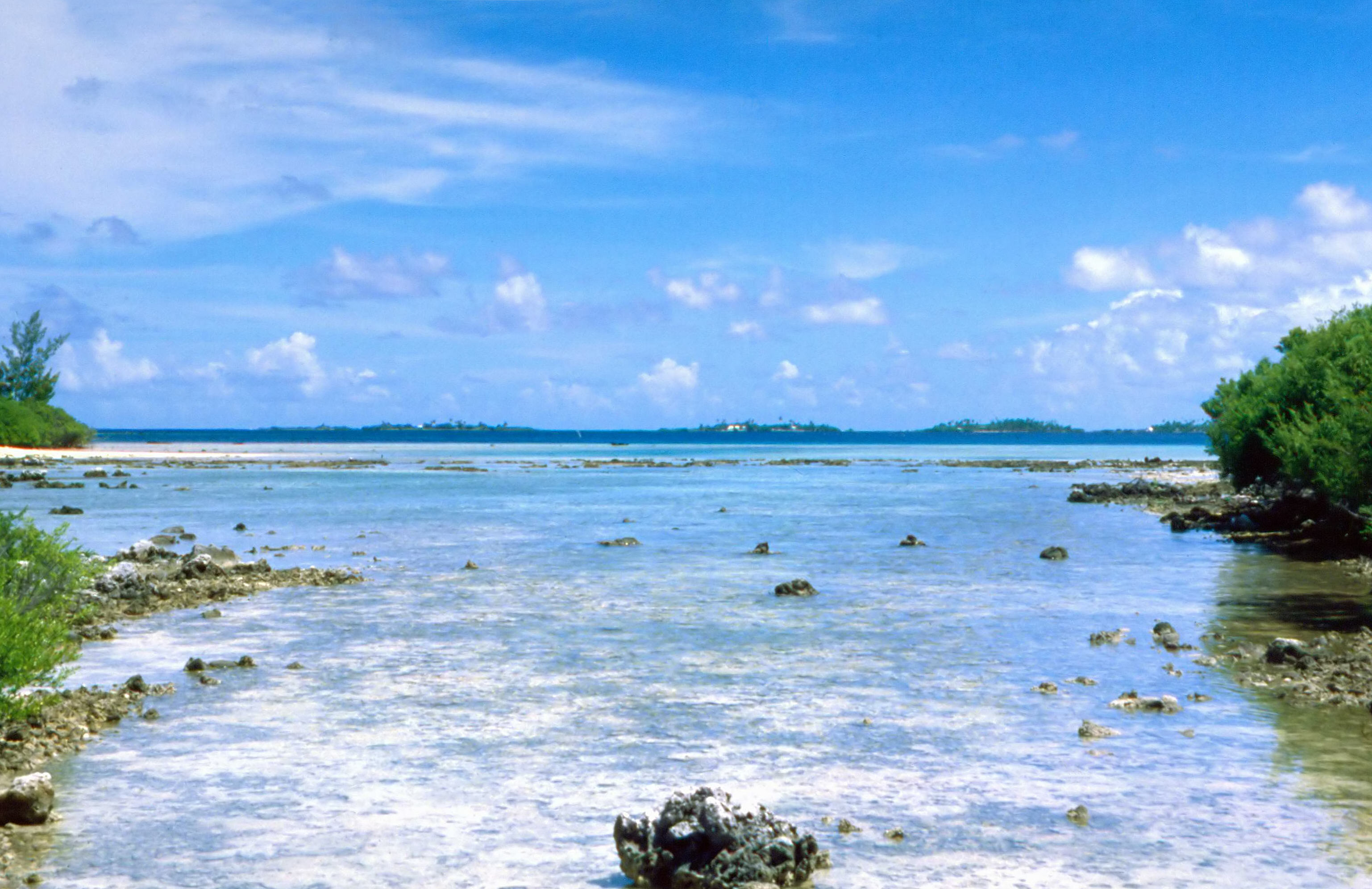
View of the lagoon

Manihi is a relatively large elongated atoll. Its oval-shaped lagoon measures 27 km in length and 8 km in width, and is ringed by innumerable islets. The lagoon is well known among snorkelers for its beautiful and diverse marine fauna, including, among other species, the manta ray. There is only one pass to enter the lagoon, located close to the atoll's southern end. It is known as Passe de Tairapa. 14.4585°S 146.0610°W

The chief village is Paeua. Another important village, Turipaoa, is located in the south-western part of the atoll, and is home to about 400 inhabitants. Several of the islands are inhabited, by populations ranging from single individuals to as many as 400.

== Demographics ==
Change in population of Manihi atoll.

Historical population

Year	Pop.	±%
1977	192	—
1983	313	+63.0%
1988	429	+37.1%
1996	769	+79.3%

Year	Pop.	±%
2002	789	+2.6%
2007	816	+3.4%
2012	685	−16.1%

Sources ISPF, Mairie de Manihi
* : estimation

== History ==
There are two ancient Polynesian ceremonial platforms constructed of blocks of coral (marae in Tuamotuan) on Manihi. The first recorded Europeans to arrive to Manihi were Dutch explorers Jacob le Maire and Willem Schouten on their 1615–1616 Pacific journey. They called this atoll "Waterland Island". British explorer John Byron, who reached Manihi in June 1765, called the atoll "Prince of Wales Island".

== Economy ==
Manihi Atoll is today home to a great number of pearl farms, and was the site of French Polynesia's first black pearl farm.

There was a five star resort on Manihi, called the Pearl Beach Manihi resort, which has overwater bungalows in the lagoon. This resort closed in late 2012.

There is one airfield on the atoll, inaugurated in 1994: Manihi Airport. It is located close to Turipaoa and is served by the local airline Air Tahiti.

== Administration ==
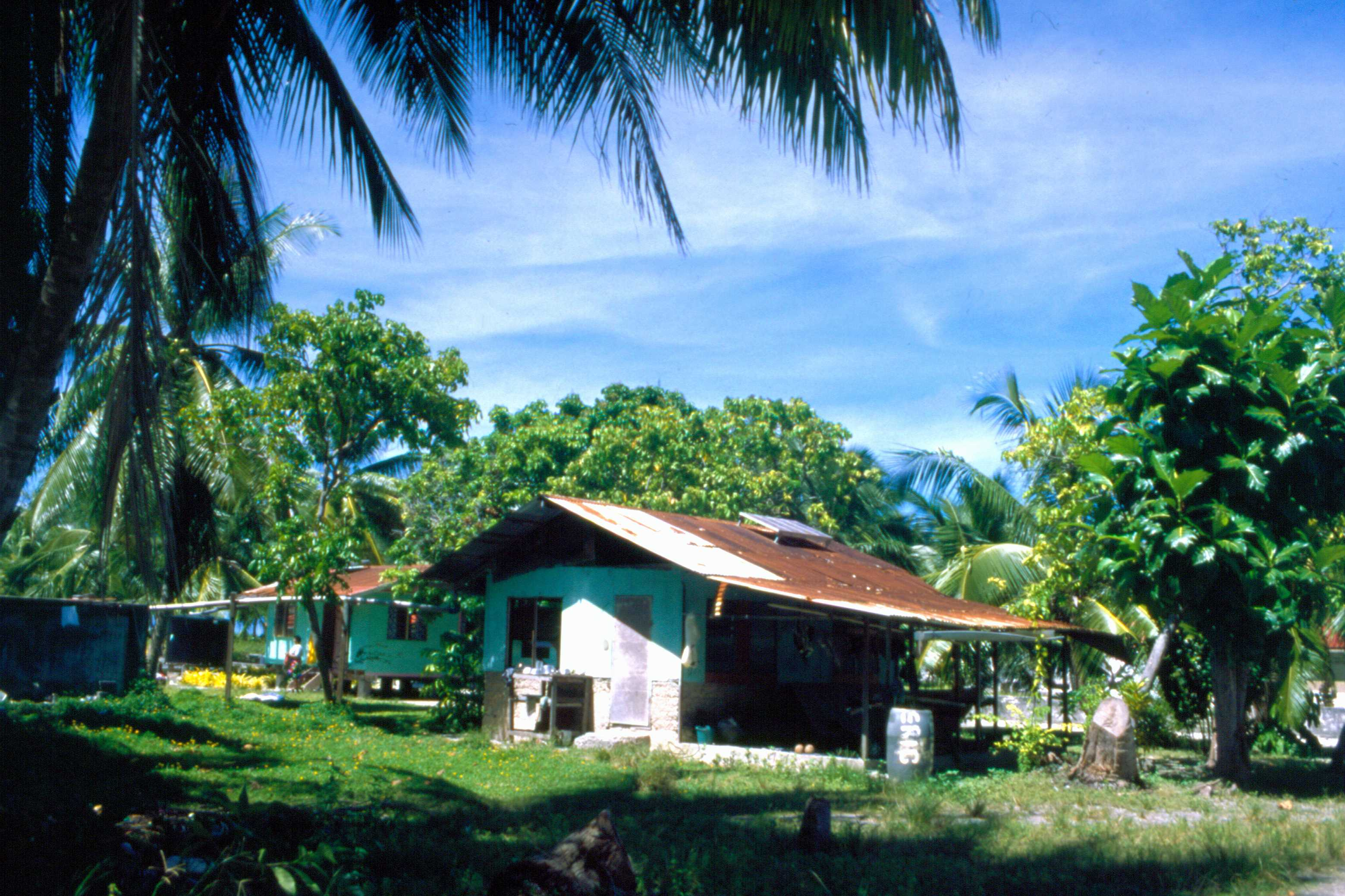
Village of Turipaoa.

The commune of Manihi consists of the island Manihi and Ahe, that are both associated communes. The seat of the commune is the village Paeua. The current mayor of the commune is John Drollet.

== See also ==
- Manihi Airport
