= List of Marquesas Islands =

The Marquesas Islands were the first of the island groups discovered by European explorers in the Pacific. Over the centuries, these Polynesian islands have been variously known by a number of names.

The islands are known in Marquesan variously as Te Henua Kenana or Te Henua ʻEnana in North Marquesan and Te Fenua ʻEnata in South Marquesan.

The first recorded European visitor to the islands was the Spanish navigator and explorer Álvaro de Mendaña de Neira who came upon them by chance in 1595. He named them "Las Islas Marquesas de Mendoza" in honor of the wife of his patron García Hurtado de Mendoza, 5th Marquis of Cañete, the Viceroy of Perú.

The islands are divided into two groups: a southern group of five islands and a northern group consisting of Ua Pou, Ua Huka and Nuku Hiva along with a set of smaller islands to the northwest. The southern and northern Marquesas have distinct forms of Marquesan geography, Marquesan language, and Marquesan culture.

While there is no native Marquesan name to differentiate between the northern and southern groups, they have been differentiated as such, at least by American navigators, historically, by the names "Washington Islands" to refer to the northern Marquesas, and "Mendaña Islands" to refer to the southern Marquesas.

Following is a list of the islands, giving first their most widely accepted Marquesan names, followed by variants:

- Eiao
  - Fremantle
  - Knox
  - Masse
  - Robert
  - Hiaou
  - Iau
- Hatutu
  - Hatutaa
  - Hatoutou
  - Chanal
  - Hancock
  - Langdon
- Motu One
  - Sable
  - Îlot de Sable
  - Lincoln
- Motu Iti
  - Hatu Iti
- Nuku Hiva
  - Nukuhiva
  - Nukahiva
  - Federal Island (named by Joseph Ingraham)
  - Adams (named by Josiah Roberts)
  - Beaux (named by Étienne Marchand)
  - Sir Henry Martin (named by Richard Hergest)
  - Madison (named by David Porter)
- Ua Huka (including Motu Papa and Epiti)
  - Uahuka
  - Huahuna
  - Riou
  - Roahonga
  - Solide
- Ua Pou (including Motu Mohoke and Motu Oa)
  - Ua Pou
  - Uapou
  - Uapu
  - Huapu
  - Adams
  - Marchand
- Fatu Uku
  - Fatuhuku
  - Fatuuku
  - Fatou Houkou
  - Hood's Island
- Hiva ʻOa (including Hanakee)
  - Hivaoa
  - Hiva Hoa
  - Hiavaoa
  - Dominica
- Tahuata
  - Taahuata
  - Tuhuata
  - Santa Christina
- Moho Tani
  - Motane
  - Mohotane
  - San Pedro
- Fatu Hiva
  - Fatu Iva
  - Fatouhiva
  - Magdalena
- Motu Nao
  - Thomasset Rock
  - Rocher Thomasset
  - Ariane Rock
