= Geography of the Marquesas Islands =

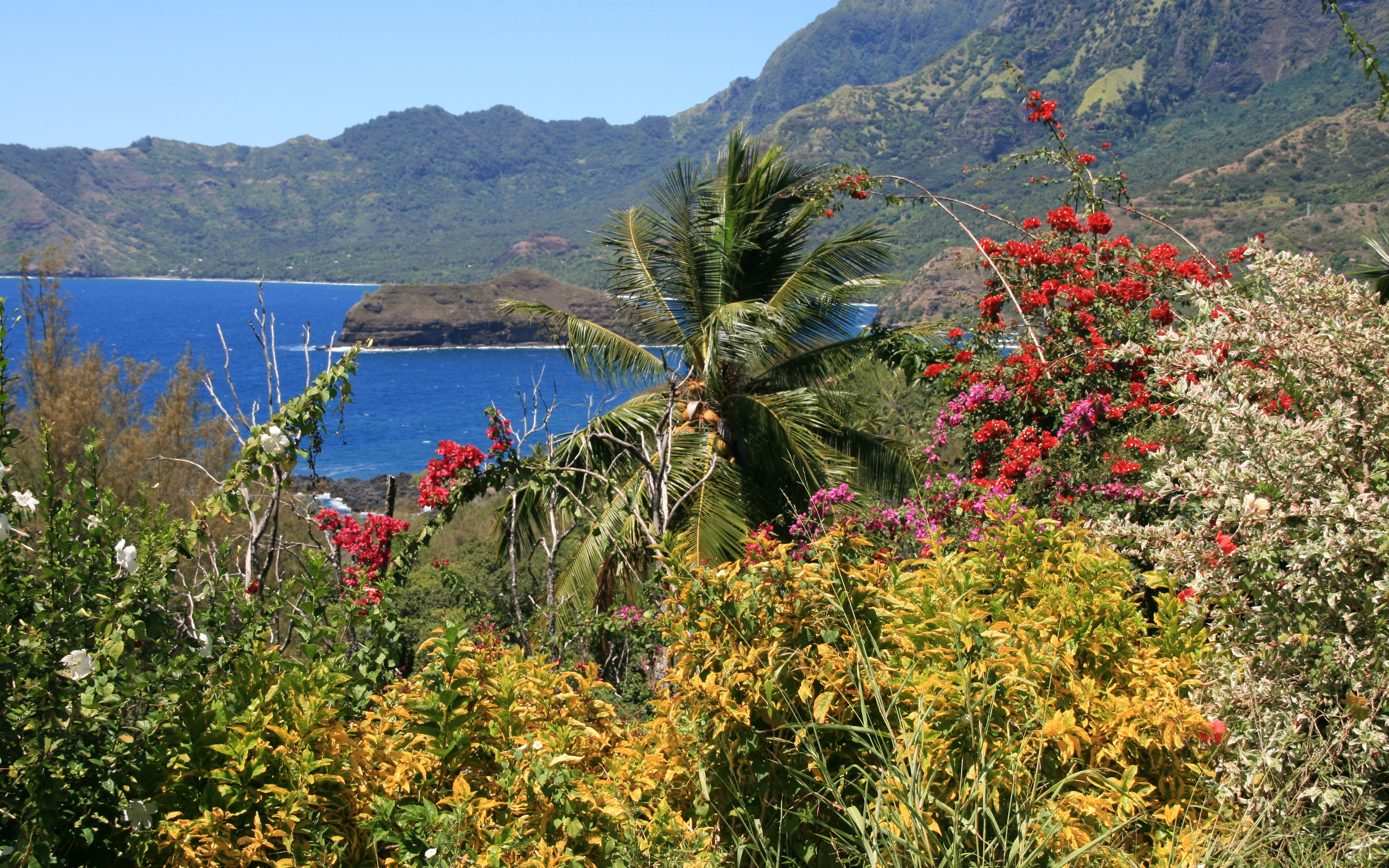
Coastal vegetation on Hiva Oa, the second largest of the Marquesas Islands

The Marquesas Islands are the island group farthest from any continent in the world, lying between 400 and 600 miles (600 and 1,000 km) south of the equator and approximately 740 miles (1,200 km) northeast of Tahiti. A pair of volcanic archipelagoes, they fall naturally into two geographical divisions, The northwestern group consists of Eïao, Hatutu (Hatutaa), Motu One, and the islands centered on the large island of Nuku Hiva: Motu Iti (Hatu Iti), Ua Pou, Motu Oa and Ua Huka. The southeastern group consists of Fatu Uku, Tahuata, Moho Tani (Motane), Terihi, Fatu Hiva and Motu Nao (Thomasset Rock), clustered around the main island of Hiva Oa which is the largest and most populous island of the southeastern group.

With a combined land area of 405 square miles (1,050 km^{2}), the Marquesas are among the largest island groups of French Polynesia, Nuku Hiva being the second largest island in the entire territory, after Tahiti. With the exception of Motu One, all the islands of the Marquesas are of volcanic origin.

The Marquesas are one of the few island groups in Polynesia where precipitation is not abundant. Most of the islands are subject to frequent drought conditions due to their geographic location and periodic fluctuations in the normally prevailing easterly winds. Although the islands lie within the tropics, they are the first major break in the prevailing easterly winds spawned from the extraordinarily dry (from an atmospheric perspective) Humboldt Current. The annual rainfall is generally around 1,270 millimetres (50 inches), but this average is misleading because of very high variability. In La Niña years, rainfall can decline to less than 500 millimetres (20 inches), whilst in El Niño years when the ocean warms it can reach 2,800 millimetres (110 inches). Unlike the rest of French Polynesia, most rain falls during the cooler months, with May to July usually the wettest and November the driest.

Because of their exceptionally variable climate, the islands are subject to extreme drought and flood conditions. Although they are mostly high and craggy with jagged peaks rising to 4,000 feet (1,200 metres) in places, only two of the ten islands have elevations above about 750 metres (2,500 feet) and these are the only ones that have sufficiently reliable precipitation for the development of rainforests. This has led to historical fluctuations in water supply, which has been a crucial factor in the sustainability of human populations in certain sections of the various islands throughout the archipelago. This is especially evident in the low historical population of Ua Huka which has a maximum elevation of 2,812 feet (860 metres), and the intermittent inhabitability of Eiao which has a maximum elevation of 1,890 feet (580 metres).

The islands lack both coastal plains and coral reefs. As a result, habitation is generally found only where streams run down from the mountains in narrow valleys. Agricultural products include copra, taro, breadfruit, coffee beans and vanilla. The islands have also developed a tourist industry.

The Marquesas Islands are thought to have formed from a center of upwelling magma called the Marquesas hotspot.

== See also ==
- List of Marquesas Islands
