= Puamau =

Puama'u
- Associated commune of Hiva-Oa
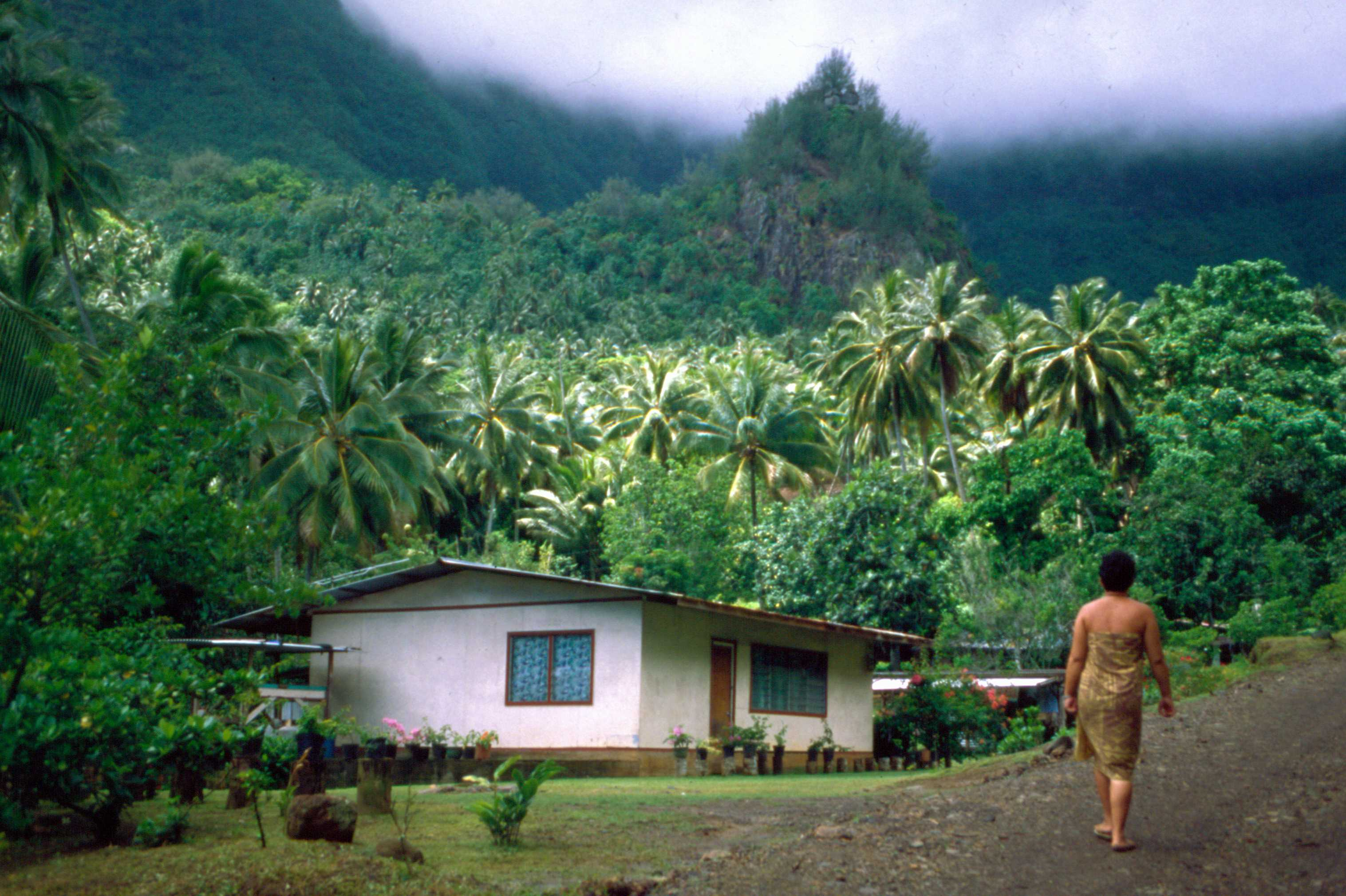

- Location within Marquesas Islands
- Location of Puama'u
- Coordinates: 9°48′14″S 139°2′20″W
- Country: France
- Overseas collectivity: French Polynesia
- Subdivision: Marquesas Islands
- Commune: Hiva-Oa
- Elevation: 9 m (30 ft)
- Population (2022): 378
- Time zone: UTC−9:30

Puama'u is an associated commune of Hiva-Oa, in French Polynesia. According to the 2022 census, it had a population of 378 people.
