= Hiva-Oa =

Commune in French Polynesia, France

- Commune
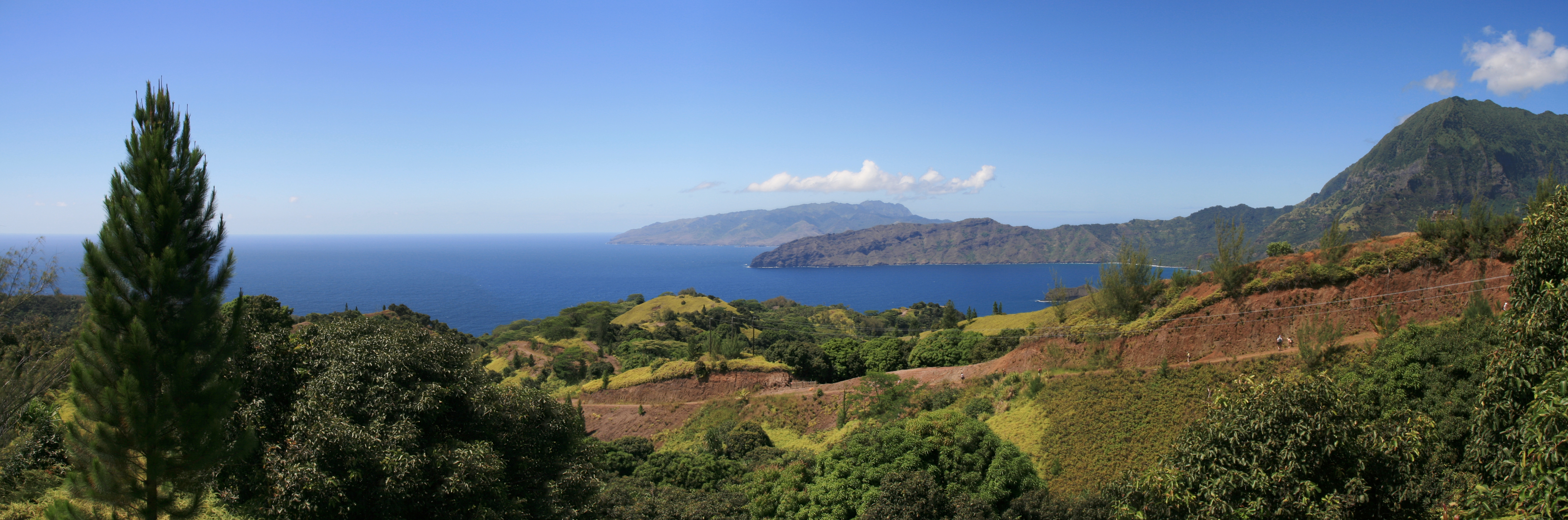
- A view from Hiva-Oa, to the southwest

- Flag

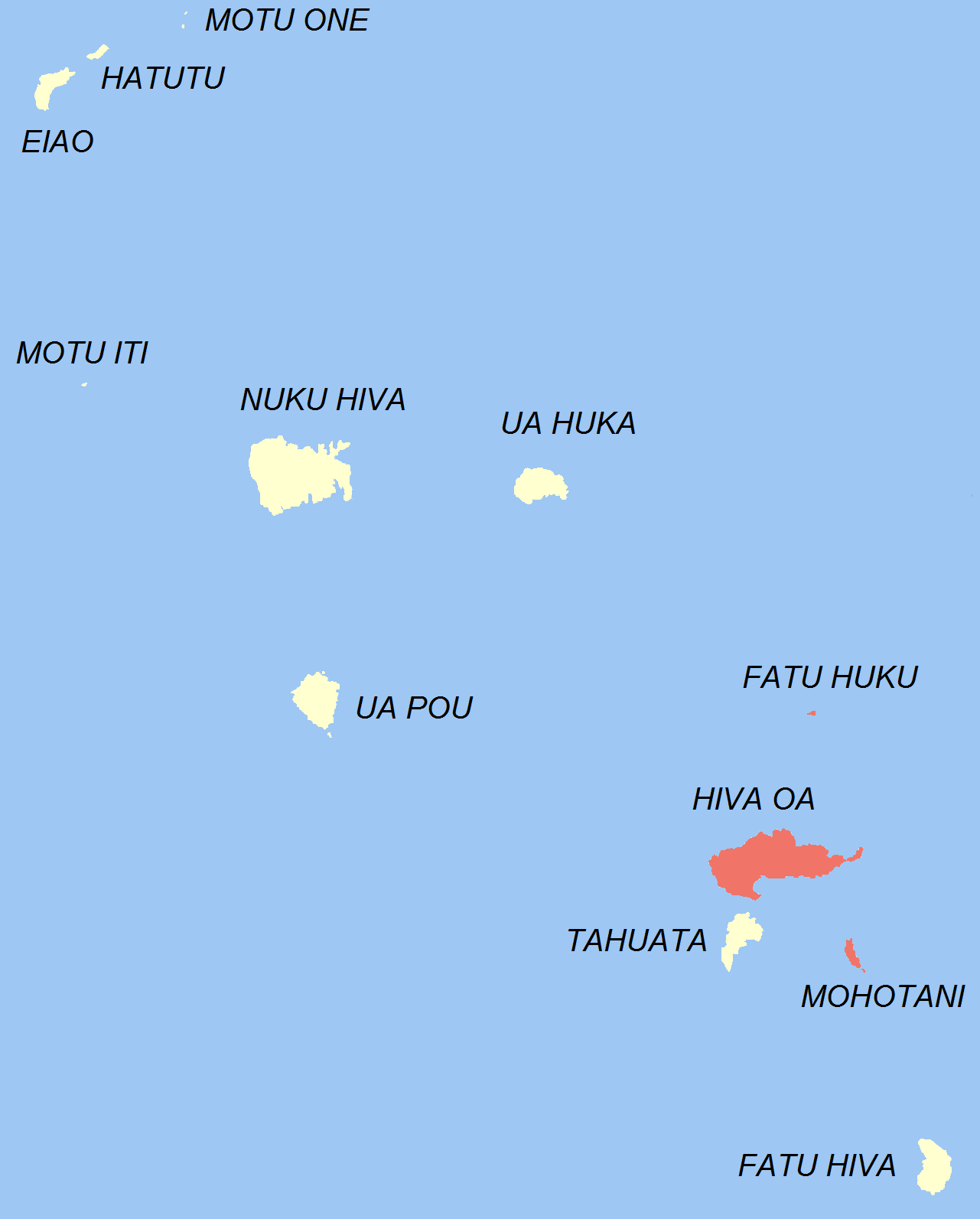
- Location of the commune (in red) within the Marquesas Islands
- Location of Hiva-Oa
- Coordinates: 9°45′S 139°00′W
- Country: France
- Overseas collectivity: French Polynesia
- Subdivision: Marquesas Islands

Government
  - Mayor (2020–2026): Joëlle Frebault
- Area^{1}: 326.5 km^{2} (126.1 sq mi)
- Highest elevation: 1,213 m (3,980 ft)
- Lowest elevation: 0 m (0 ft)
- Population (2022): 2,371
  - Density: 7.262/km^{2} (18.81/sq mi)
- Time zone: UTC−09:30
- INSEE/Postal code: 98723 /98741
- ^{1} French Land Register data, which excludes lakes, ponds, glaciers > 1 km^{2} (0.386 sq mi or 247 acres) and river estuaries.

Hiva-Oa is a commune of French Polynesia, an overseas territory of France in the Pacific Ocean. The commune is in the administrative subdivision of the Marquesas Islands. Its population was 2,371 at the 2022 census.

The commune of Hiva-Oa is made up of the island of Hiva Oa proper (316 km^{2} (122 sq mi)), which contains the entire population of the commune, and the uninhabited islands of:

- Mohotani, located 18 km (11 mi) south of Hiva Oa
- Fatu Huku, located 31 km (19 mi) north of Hiva Oa

Hiva-Oa consists of the following associated communes:

- Atuona
- Puamau

The administrative centre of the commune is the settlement of Atuona, on the southern side of the island of Hiva Oa.

The Island is internationally perhaps best known as the place where the French and Belgian artists Paul Gauguin and Jacques Brel spent their final years and is their final resting place.

== Climate ==
Hiva-Oa features a tropical monsoon climate (Köppen: Am).

Climate data for Hiva-Oa (1991−2020 normals, extremes 1939−present)
Month	Jan	Feb	Mar	Apr	May	Jun	Jul	Aug	Sep	Oct	Nov	Dec	Year
Record high °C (°F)	35.3 (95.5)	35.0 (95.0)	35.0 (95.0)	35.0 (95.0)	34.7 (94.5)	33.8 (92.8)	33.0 (91.4)	32.6 (90.7)	34.2 (93.6)	34.7 (94.5)	35.0 (95.0)	36.1 (97.0)	36.1 (97.0)
Mean daily maximum °C (°F)	31.2 (88.2)	31.5 (88.7)	31.5 (88.7)	31.2 (88.2)	30.5 (86.9)	29.6 (85.3)	29.0 (84.2)	29.0 (84.2)	29.6 (85.3)	30.4 (86.7)	30.9 (87.6)	31.1 (88.0)	30.5 (86.9)
Daily mean °C (°F)	27.3 (81.1)	27.6 (81.7)	27.8 (82.0)	27.6 (81.7)	27.1 (80.8)	26.4 (79.5)	26.0 (78.8)	25.8 (78.4)	26.2 (79.2)	26.6 (79.9)	26.9 (80.4)	27.2 (81.0)	26.9 (80.4)
Mean daily minimum °C (°F)	23.4 (74.1)	23.7 (74.7)	24.0 (75.2)	24.0 (75.2)	23.7 (74.7)	23.3 (73.9)	22.9 (73.2)	22.6 (72.7)	22.7 (72.9)	22.7 (72.9)	23.0 (73.4)	23.3 (73.9)	23.3 (73.9)
Record low °C (°F)	19.2 (66.6)	18.3 (64.9)	19.9 (67.8)	19.8 (67.6)	19.2 (66.6)	18.5 (65.3)	17.7 (63.9)	16.8 (62.2)	18.0 (64.4)	18.0 (64.4)	18.6 (65.5)	17.5 (63.5)	16.8 (62.2)
Average precipitation mm (inches)	134.4 (5.29)	116.1 (4.57)	178.2 (7.02)	170.2 (6.70)	135.7 (5.34)	151.7 (5.97)	151.2 (5.95)	121.1 (4.77)	87.9 (3.46)	87.1 (3.43)	94.1 (3.70)	68.6 (2.70)	1,496.3 (58.91)
Average precipitation days (≥ 1.0 mm)	12.6	12.8	15.2	13.6	14.4	14.9	16.4	14.8	11.9	12.0	11.7	9.9	160.1
Mean monthly sunshine hours	219.2	202.3	210.5	196.3	194.1	172.7	174.6	185.7	197.9	222.4	214.1	228.1	2,417.8
Source: Météo-France
