= Taipivai (village) =

- Associated commune of Nuku-Hiva
- Location within Marquesas Islands
- Location of Taipivai
- Coordinates: 8°52′26.58″S 140°3′26.20″W
- Country: France
- Overseas collectivity: French Polynesia
- Subdivision: Marquesas Islands
- Commune: Nuku-Hiva
- Area^{1}: 4.333 km^{2} (1.673 sq mi)
- Population (2022): 415
  - Density: 95.8/km^{2} (248/sq mi)
- Time zone: UTC−9:30
- ^{1} French Land Register data, which excludes lakes, ponds, glaciers > 1 km^{2} (0.386 sq mi or 247 acres) and river estuaries.

Taipivai is a town on Nuku Hiva island.
