= Nuku-Hiva =

Commune in French Polynesia, France

- Commune
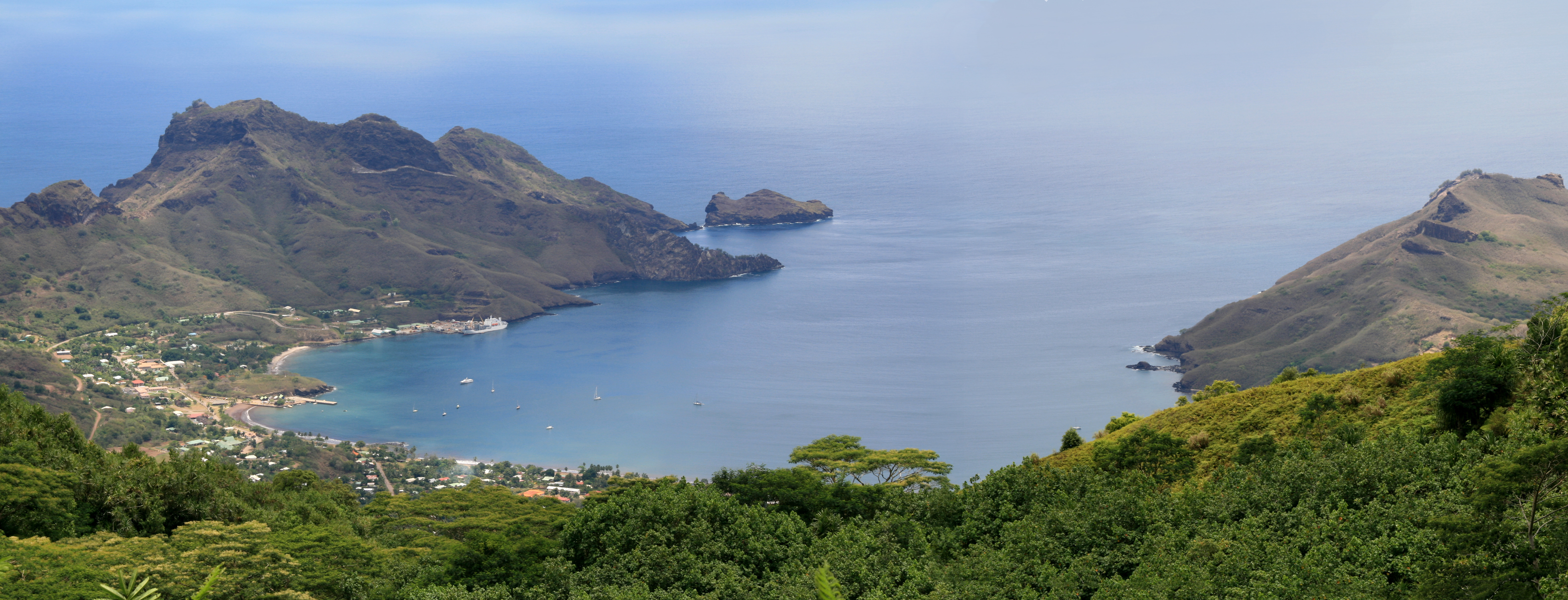
- Taiohae Bay, Nuku-Hiva

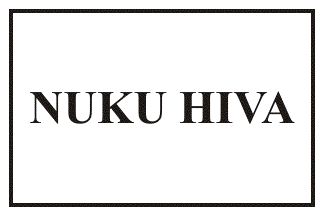
- Flag

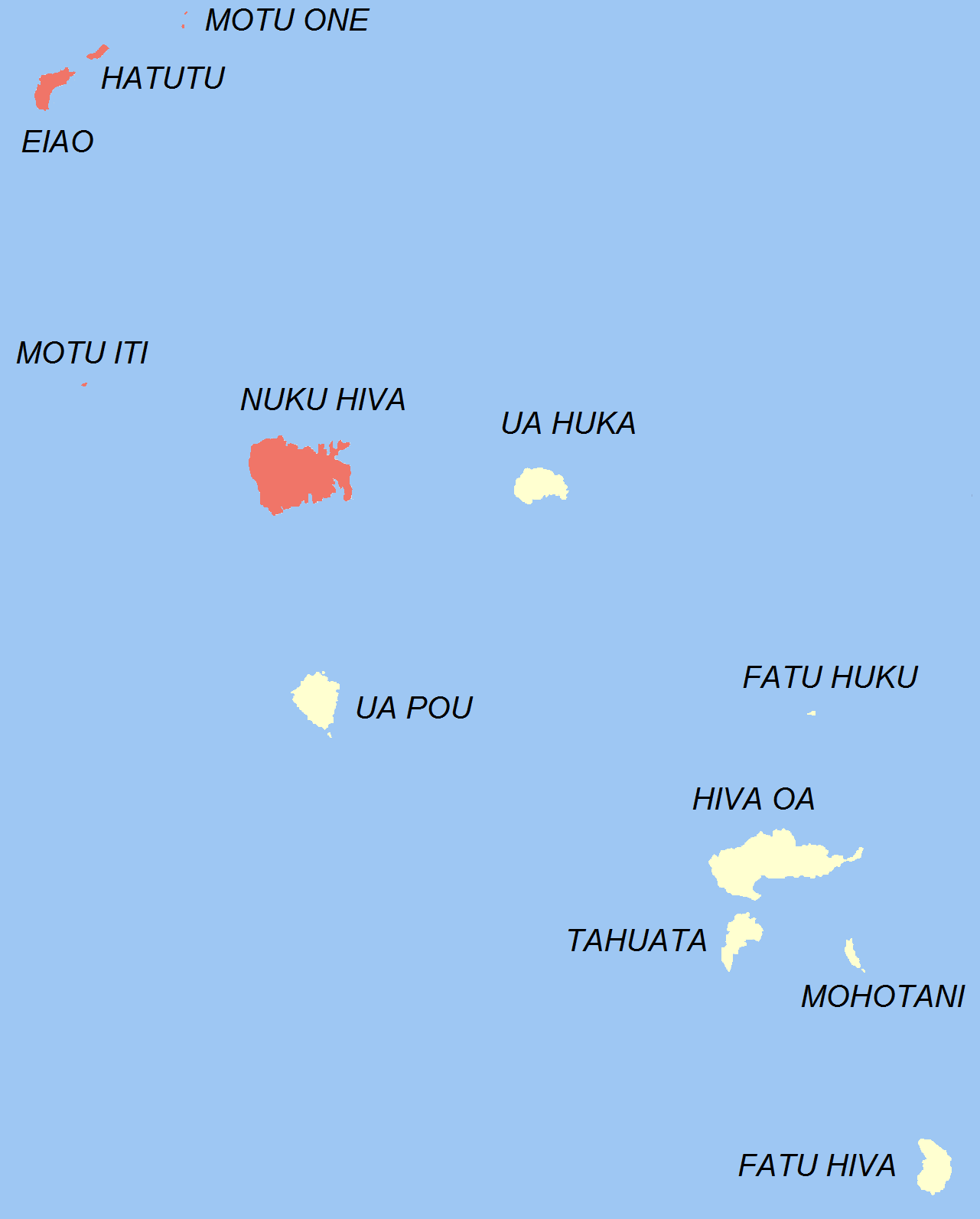
- Location of the commune (in red) within the Marquesas Islands
- Location of Nuku-Hiva
- Coordinates: 8°49′13″S 140°12′45″W
- Country: France
- Overseas collectivity: French Polynesia
- Subdivision: Marquesas Islands

Government
  - Mayor (2020–2026): Benoît Kautai
- Area^{1}: 387.8 km^{2} (149.7 sq mi)
- Highest elevation: 1,224 m (4,016 ft)
- Lowest elevation: 0 m (0 ft)
- Population (2022): 3,025
  - Density: 7.800/km^{2} (20.20/sq mi)
- Time zone: UTC−09:30
- INSEE/Postal code: 98731 /98742
- ^{1} French Land Register data, which excludes lakes, ponds, glaciers > 1 km^{2} (0.386 sq mi or 247 acres) and river estuaries.

Nuku-Hiva is a commune of French Polynesia, an overseas territory of France in the Pacific Ocean. The commune is in the administrative subdivision of the Marquesas Islands. Its population was 3,025 at the 2022 census.

The commune of Nuku-Hiva is made up of the island of Nuku Hiva proper (339 km^{2} (131 sq mi)), which contains the entire population of the commune, and the uninhabited islands of:

- Eiao, located 97 km (60 mi) northwest of Nuku Hiva
- Hatutu, located 103 km (64 mi) northwest of Nuku Hiva
- Motu One, located 105 km (65 mi) north of Nuku Hiva
- Motu Iti, located 48 km (30 mi) west of Nuku Hiva

Nuka-Hiva consists of the following associated communes:

- Hatiheu
- Taiohae
- Taipivai

The administrative centre of the commune is the settlement of Taiohae, on the southern side of the island of Nuku Hiva.
