= Hatihe'u =

Village and archaeological site in French Polynesia

- Associated commune of Nuku-Hiva
- Location within Marquesas Islands
- Location of Hatihe'u
- Coordinates: 8°49′45″S 140°4′59″W
- Country: France
- Overseas collectivity: French Polynesia
- Subdivision: Marquesas Islands
- Commune: Nuku-Hiva
- Area^{1}: 0.245 km^{2} (0.095 sq mi)
- Population (2022): 392
  - Density: 1,600/km^{2} (4,140/sq mi)
- Time zone: UTC−9:30
- ^{1} French Land Register data, which excludes lakes, ponds, glaciers > 1 km^{2} (0.386 sq mi or 247 acres) and river estuaries.

Hatihe'u is a village in Nuku Hiva, in the Marquesas Islands. It lies on the bay of the same name and is also the name of an "amphitheater-shaped valley on the northeast side of the island". An ancient village in the area contains petroglyphs. Archaeologists have identified some 400 different features in the Hatihe'u Valley area.
