= Theo Sulpice =

Theo Sulpice Théophile Tanaapupa Sulpice
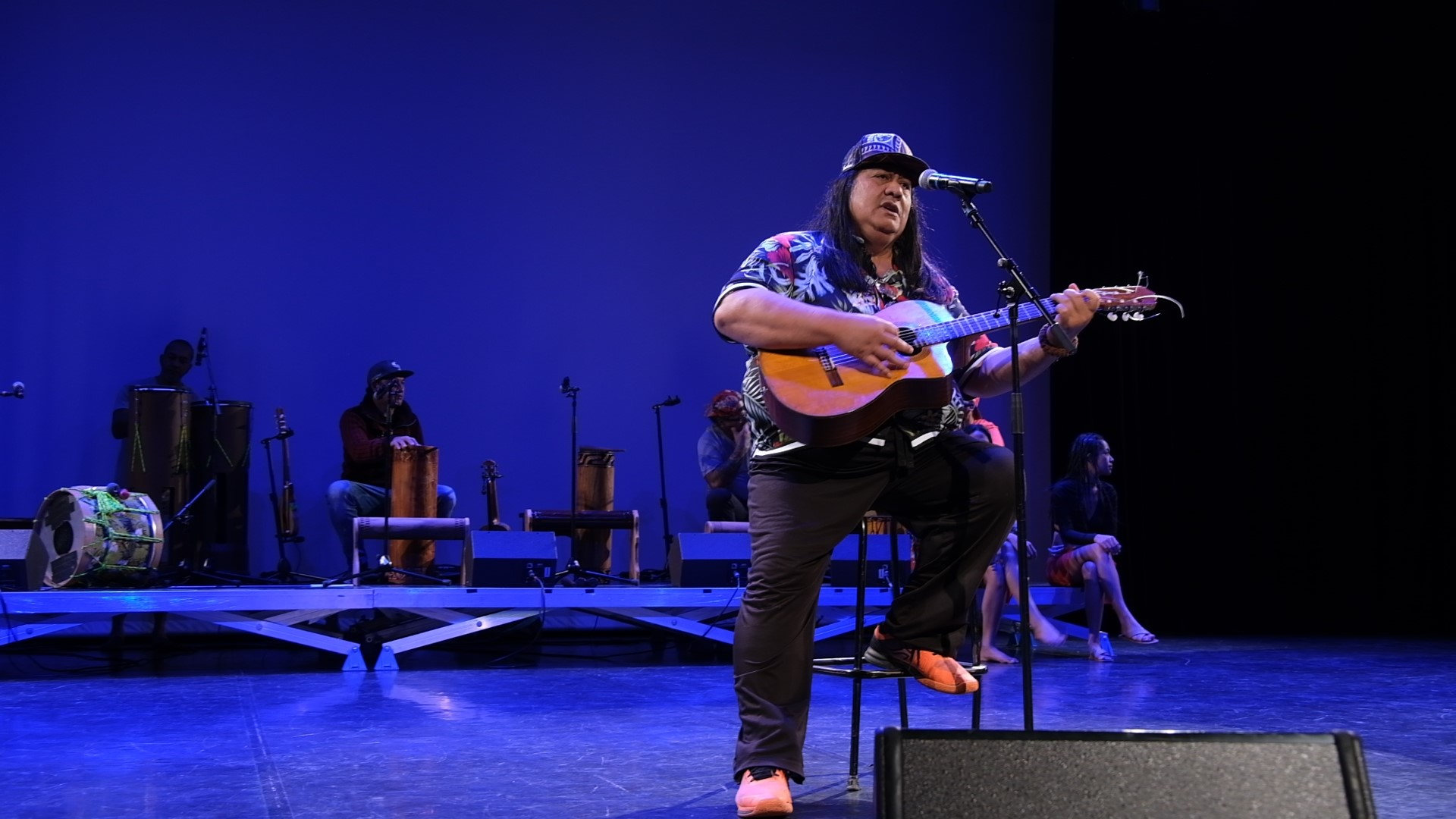

Background information
- Born: 10 November 1964 (age 60); Taioahe, French Polynesia
- Genres: Polynesian variety, Traditional music of the Marquesas
- Occupation(s): Singer-songwriter, troop leader
- Instrument: Ukulele
- Years active: Since 1982
- Website: https://www.tahitiauxmarquises.com/carriere-theo-sulpice

Théophile Tanaapupa Sulpice (born 10 November 1964), better known under the name Théo Sulpice, is a French Polynesian singer-songwriter and leader of a Polynesian dance troupe. Since the end of the 1980s, he has been the main ambassador of Polynesian culture internationally.

== Biography ==
Sulpice was born in Taioahe on the island of Nuku Hiva in the Marquesas archipelago. He left school at fourteen and worked in a bakery before being recruited as a dancer by Paulette Vienot's troupe, the ballet Tahiti Nui, with whom he left for a first six-month tour of South America, followed by several years on the stages of five continents. In 1985 he moved to Paris where he founded the ballet Tamure Tahiti, which began performing at the Blue Elephant cabaret, where Maria Candido encouraged him to take music theory lessons with Rudy Hirigoyen.

From 1989 the Tamure Tahiti ballet expanded to reach a staff of forty dancers, and toured more and more around the world. In 1992 the troupe was renamed Show Tahiti Nui.

His hit Tamahine sold 580,000 albums in 1996. Théo Sulpice became a regular on television sets, often invited to Jacques Martin and Michel Drucker. Vahinés and the Polynesian dream are exported all over the world. He then founded and chaired the SPAC (Polynesian Union of Authors and Composers), to help Polynesian artists who are often exploited to assert their rights.

In 2015, at the invitation of Ban Ki Moon, Secretary General of the UN, his troupe Show Tahiti Nui performed at the United Nations in New York to mark the 70th anniversary of the organization. The Polynesians present their show in front of an audience of 150 heads of state.

In 2016 the troupe was renamed Tahiti in the Marquesas. In 2023 Théo and his troupe will celebrate their 36th career in Paris at the Saint-Germain theater. In 36 years, Théo Sulpice, who renews his troupe every year, will have toured the world with more than 1900 Polynesian artists.
