= Mont Oave =

Mountain in French Polynesia

Coordinates: 9°23′30″S 140°04′42″W

Oave

Highest point
- Elevation: 1,203 m (3,947 ft)
- Prominence: 1,203 m (3,947 ft)
- Listing: Ribu

Geology
- Last eruption: Unknown

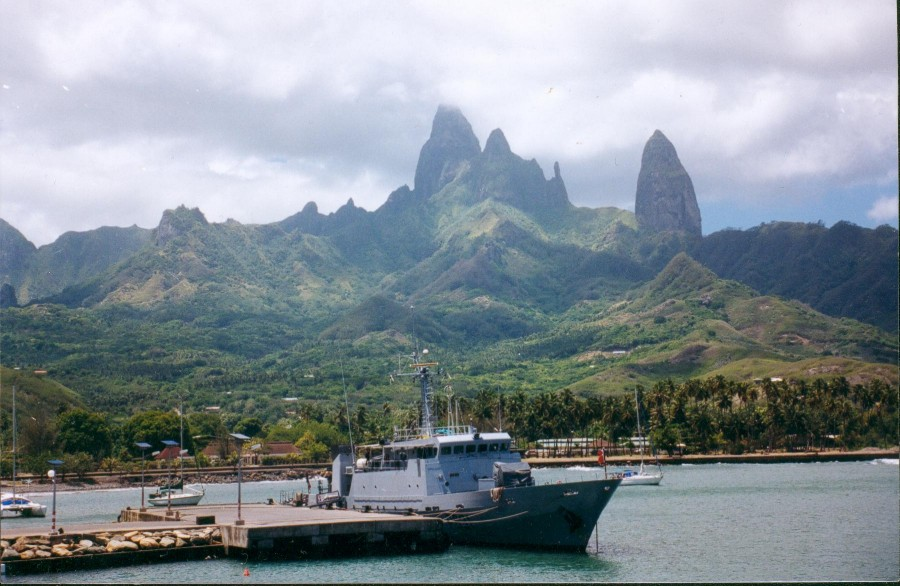

Mount Oave (French: Mont Oave) is a mountain and the highest point of the Marquesas Islands of French Polynesia. Oave is a volcanic mountain, located on Ua Pou island at 1,203 metres (3,947 ft) above sea level.

== Topography ==
The summit is a basalt pillar. With a topographic isolation of 846 kilometres (526 mi), it is the 55th most isolated peak in the world.

== Culture ==
The mountain was featured on French postage stamps in 1979 and 1985.
