= Taioha'e =

- Associated commune of Nuku-Hiva
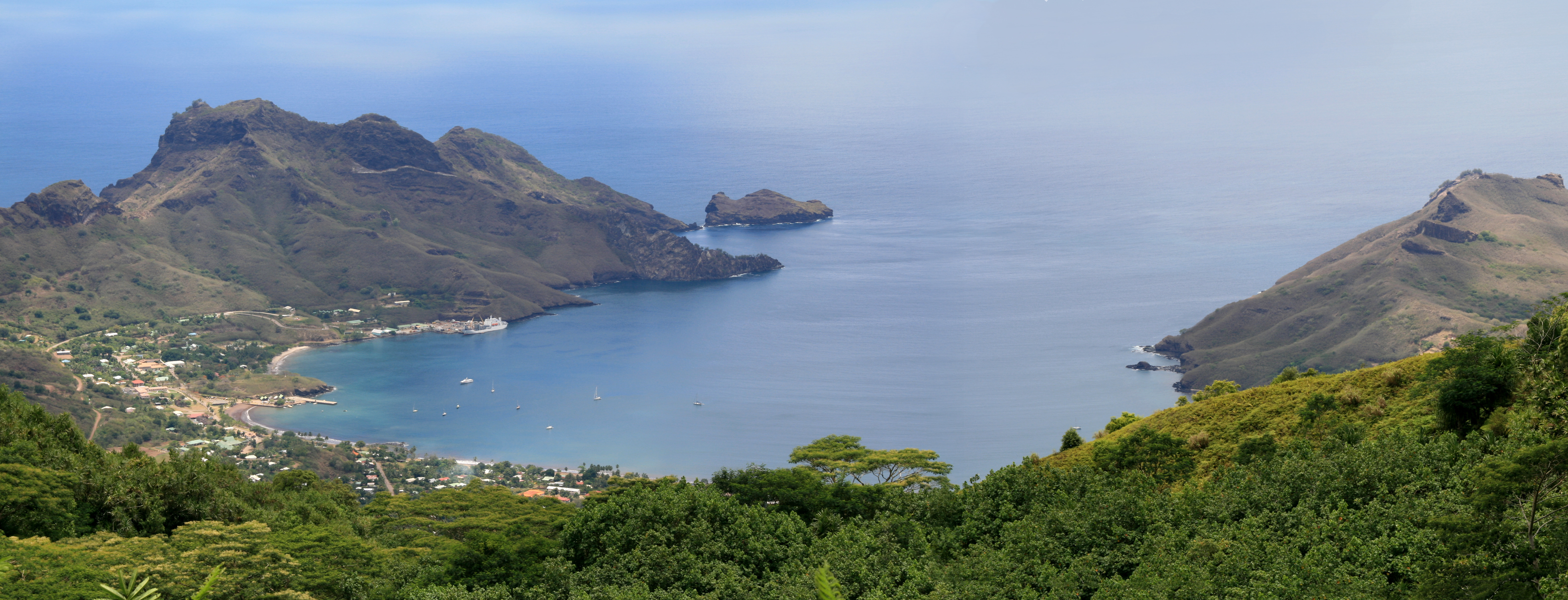
- View of Taiohae and Taiohae Bay

- Location within Marquesas Islands
- Location of Taioha'e
- Coordinates: 8°54′35″S 140°6′5″W
- Country: France
- Overseas collectivity: French Polynesia
- Subdivision: Marquesas Islands
- Commune: Nuku-Hiva
- Area^{1}: 4.279 km^{2} (1.652 sq mi)
- Population (2022): 2,218
  - Density: 518.3/km^{2} (1,343/sq mi)
- Time zone: UTC−9:30
- ^{1} French Land Register data, which excludes lakes, ponds, glaciers > 1 km^{2} (0.386 sq mi or 247 acres) and river estuaries.

Taioha'e is the main town on Nuku Hiva island. The town is located on a former volcanic crater, which has partly collapsed into the ocean, creating a bay.

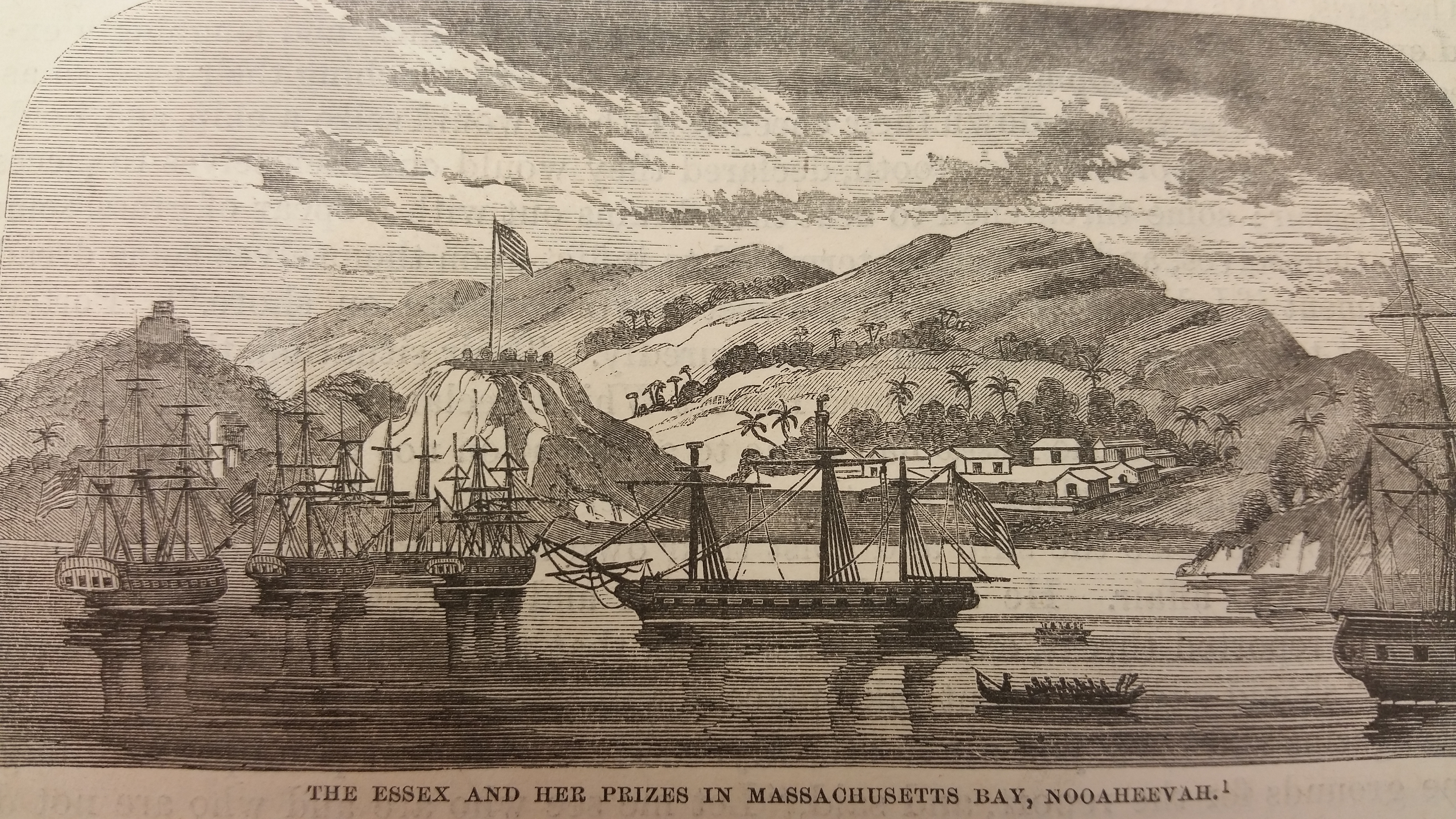
Commodore Porter's fleet with the Essex and her prizes in Massachusetts Bay, Nooaheevah in 1813

This is the site of Fort Madison, set up by David Porter in 1813.
