= Motu Iti (Marquesas Islands) =

Island in French Polynesia

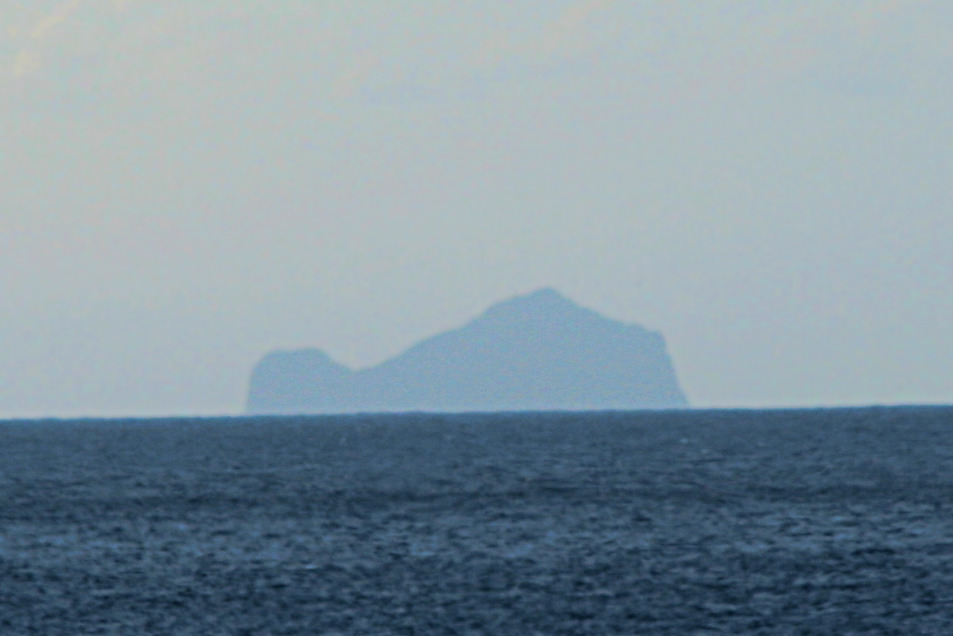
- Motu Iti

- Location within French Polynesia

Geography
- Location: French Polynesia
- Coordinates: 8°40′48″S 140°37′00″W
- Archipelago: Marquesas Islands
- Area: .24 km^{2} (0.093 sq mi)
- Highest elevation: 232 m (761 ft)

Administration
- French Polynesia
- Division: Marquesas Islands
- Commune: Nuku-Hiva

Demographics
- Population: 0

Motu Iti (sometimes also called Hatu Iti) is one of the northern Marquesas Islands in French Polynesia. Located 43km northwest of Nuku Hiva, Motu Iti is the site of extensive seabird rookeries. It is administratively part of the commune (municipality) of Nuku-Hiva, itself in the administrative subdivision of the Marquesas Islands.

== Geography ==
Motu Iti is a volcanic islet created by the Marquesas hotspot. It has an area of 24 hectares and a maximum elevation of 232m. The island is surrounded by cliffs on all sides. There is no running water.

A subsidiary, unnamed rock stack has an area of 3 hectares an an elevation of 76m.

== Ecology ==
Vegetation on the island is mostly Tussock grass. Other species include Portulaca lutea, and the ferns Microsorum grossum and Nephrolepis hirsutula. There is no introduced plant-life.

The island is home to 23 species of birds, including 16 breeding and seven non-breeding species. It is home to significant populations of the Wedge-tailed shearwater, Audubon’s Shearwater, Red-tailed tropicbird, Sooty tern, and Blue noddy. Other species include the Phoenix petrel, Bulwer's petrel, Polynesian storm petrel, Masked booby, White-tailed tropicbird, Red-footed booby, Brown booby, Great frigatebird, Lesser frigatebird, Pacific reef heron, Pacific golden plover, Bristle-thighed curlew, Wandering tattler, Grey-backed Tern, Black noddy, White tern, and Marquesan swiftlet. The stack is home to a significant population of the Brown noddy.

The Polynesian rat is the only mammal present, and only on the main island. Reptiles included Cryptoblepharus poecilopleurus and Gehyra mutilata. Insects included Monomorium liliuokalanii and the Australian cockroach. There were also two species of land crab and three spiders.

== History ==
The island was once used for ceremonial and burial purposes, and several cairns and stone structures from this still survive. The lower slopes were also used by visiting fishers to dry fish.

In 1814, five sailors from an American ship were stranded on the rocky island. One survived for three years until being rescued by a passing ship.
