= Motu Nao =

Island in French Polynesia

Coordinates: 10°22′12″S 138°24′00″W

Motu Nao is the Marquesan name for a small rock island in the southeastern Marquesas Islands, approximately 22 km (14 mi) northeast of Fatu Hiva. The French name for the island is Rocher Thomasset, which in English is Thomasset Rock.

At low tide, the top of the island rises to 4 m (13 ft.) above sea level, and is sometimes almost awash at high tide.

== See also ==
- Desert island
- List of islands
