= Motu Oa =

Island in French Polynesia

Coordinates: 9.4797°S 140.0472°W

Motu Oa ("Long Rock") is a small island, 1 kilometre (0.6 mi) southeast of Ua Pou, in the northern Marquesas Islands in French Polynesia. It is 1100 meters long and up to 460 meters wide at its northern end. Its area is approximately 30 hectares, making it the largest of the satellite islands of Ua Pou. The island is a haven for seabirds and is home to boobies, noddies, terns, and petrels.
