= Fatu Huku =

Island in French Polynesia

Fatu Huku, also known as Fatu Uku, is a small island in the Marquesas Islands, approximately 30 kilometres (19 mi) north of Hiva Oa. Fatu Huku is less than 2 kilometres (1.2 mi) long and 1 kilometre (0.62 mi) wide and has an area of about 1.3 square kilometres (0.50 sq mi)

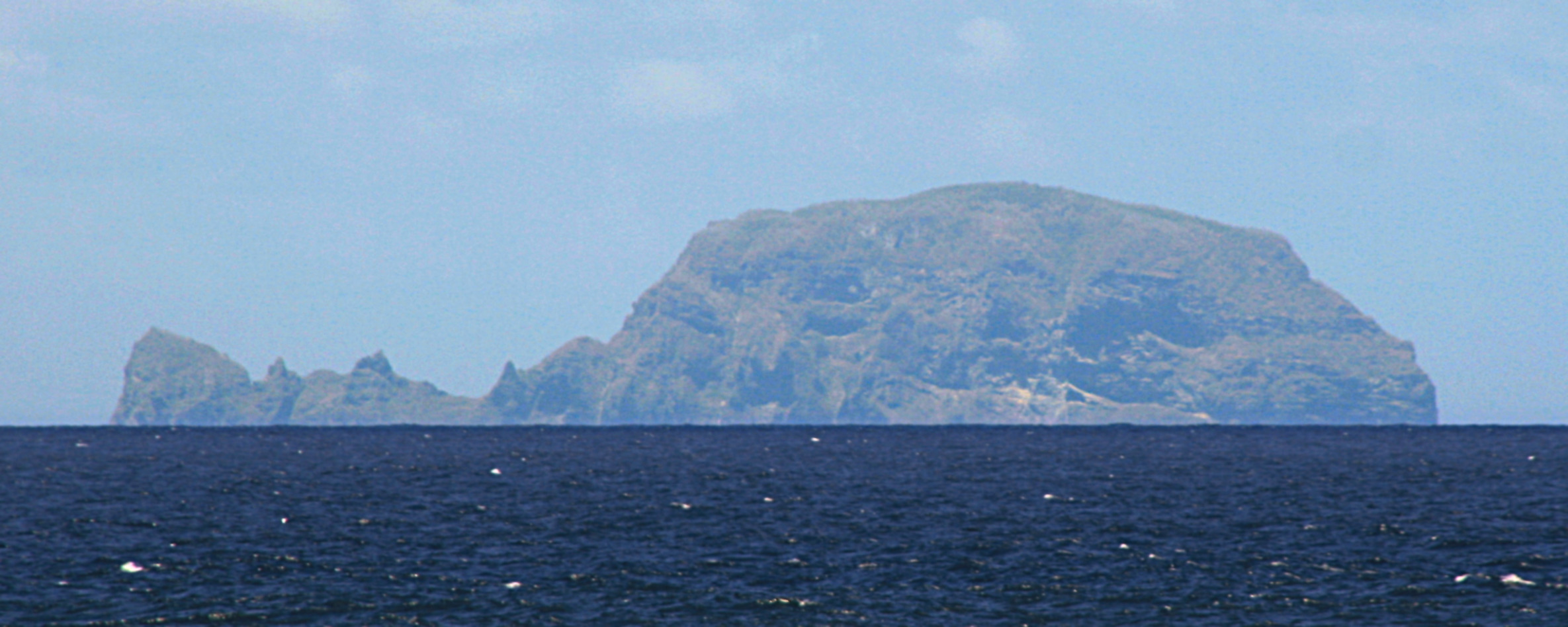
The fortress-like quality of the Marquesas Islands is exemplified in this photo of Fatu Huku.

== Government and geography ==
Fatu Huku is located at 9.43°S latitude and 138.93°W longitude. It is administratively part of the commune (municipality) of Hiva Oa in the administrative subdivision of the Marquesas Islands.

The island is essentially a huge rock, looming steep-sided out of the ocean and rising to a flattened plateau with a maximum elevation of 361 metres (1,184 ft). Fatu Huku is the youngest of the volcanic Marquesas Islands, estimated to be only 1.3 million years old which accounts, in part, for its ruggedness as erosion has not yet carved out valleys and beaches. Coral is rare in the Marquesas, but a fossilized ancient coral reef is found at the higher elevations of Fatu Huku. The island is also surrounded by a roughly triangular-shaped barrier reef that is completely submerged, but can faintly be seen on satellite images.

Fatu Huku is a dry island compared with most high islands in Polynesia, receiving only an estimated 800 millimetres (31 in) to 1,000 millimetres (39 in) of precipitation annually. The altitude is insufficient to capture much of the moisture from the predominantly easterly winds. The dryer conditions and steep terrain limit the variety of vegetation. Forty-eight percent of the land, mostly on top of the plateau, is covered with Pisonia forest; 21 percent is grassland, and 31 percent is sparsely vegetated rock. A few coconut trees are found in coastal locations. Unlike inhabited islands, Fatu Huku has few non-native species of plants and is inhabited by sea birds and imported goats and rats.

== People and culture ==
Fatu Huku was likely only ever inhabited in legend. Unreliability of water sources and lack of land suitable for agriculture were factors preventing any habitation. Fishermen occasionally visited the island. The story of the demigod Tana-Oa, patron of fishermen, says that the island was once fertile and green, until the sea, jealous of its beauty, turned the island upside down. It is said that this is how the island came to have coral on its flat top. On the plateau are a number of small heaps of stones, used to leave offerings by hunters visiting the island.

== See also ==
- Desert island
- List of islands
