= Marquesas Islands =

Archipelago in French Polynesia

Native name: Îles Marquises (French) Te Fenua ʻEnata (South Marquesan) Te Henua Enana (North Marquesan)
- Flag of the Marquesas Islands

Geography
- Location: Pacific Ocean
- Coordinates: 8°54′S 139°36′W
- Archipelago: Polynesia
- Total islands: 15
- Major islands: Nuku Hiva, Ua Pou, Ua Huka, Hiva ʻOa, Fatu Hiva, Tahuata
- Area: 1,049.3 km^{2} (405.1 sq mi)
- Highest elevation: 1,230 m (4040 ft)
- Highest point: Mount Oave (Ua Pou)

Administration
- France
- Collectivity: French Polynesia
- Largest settlement: Taioha'e (pop. 2,183 (2017))

Demographics
- Population: 9,346 (2017)
- Pop. density: 8.9/km^{2} (23.1/sq mi)
- Languages: French, Marquesan

Additional information
- Time zone: UTC−9:30

UNESCO World Heritage Site
- Official name: Te Henua Enata – The Marquesas Islands
- Type: Mixed
- Criteria: iii, vi, vii, ix, x
- Designated: 2024 (46th session)
- Reference no.: 1707
- Region: Oceania

The Marquesas Islands (/mɑːrˈkeɪsəs/ mar-KAY-səss; French: Îles Marquises or Archipel des Marquises or Marquises [maʁkiz]; Marquesan: Te Henua ʻEnana (North Marquesan) and Te Fenua ʻEnata (South Marquesan), both meaning "the land of men") are a group of volcanic islands in French Polynesia, an overseas collectivity of France in the southern Pacific Ocean. Their highest point is the peak of Mount Oave (French: Mont Oave) on Ua Pou island, at 1,230 m (4,035 ft) above sea level.

Archaeological research suggests the islands were settled in the 10th century AD by voyagers from West Polynesia. Over the centuries that followed, the islands have maintained a "remarkably uniform culture, biology and language". The Marquesas were named after the 16th-century Spanish Viceroy of Peru, the Marquis of Cañete (Spanish: Marqués de Cañete), by navigator Álvaro de Mendaña, who visited them in 1595.

The Marquesas Islands constitute one of the five administrative divisions (subdivisions administratives) of French Polynesia. The capital of the Marquesas Islands' administrative subdivision is the town of Taioha'e, on the island of Nuku Hiva. The population of the Marquesas Islands was 9,346 inhabitants at the time of the August 2017 census.

== Geography ==
Location of the Marquesas Islands in the Pacific Ocean

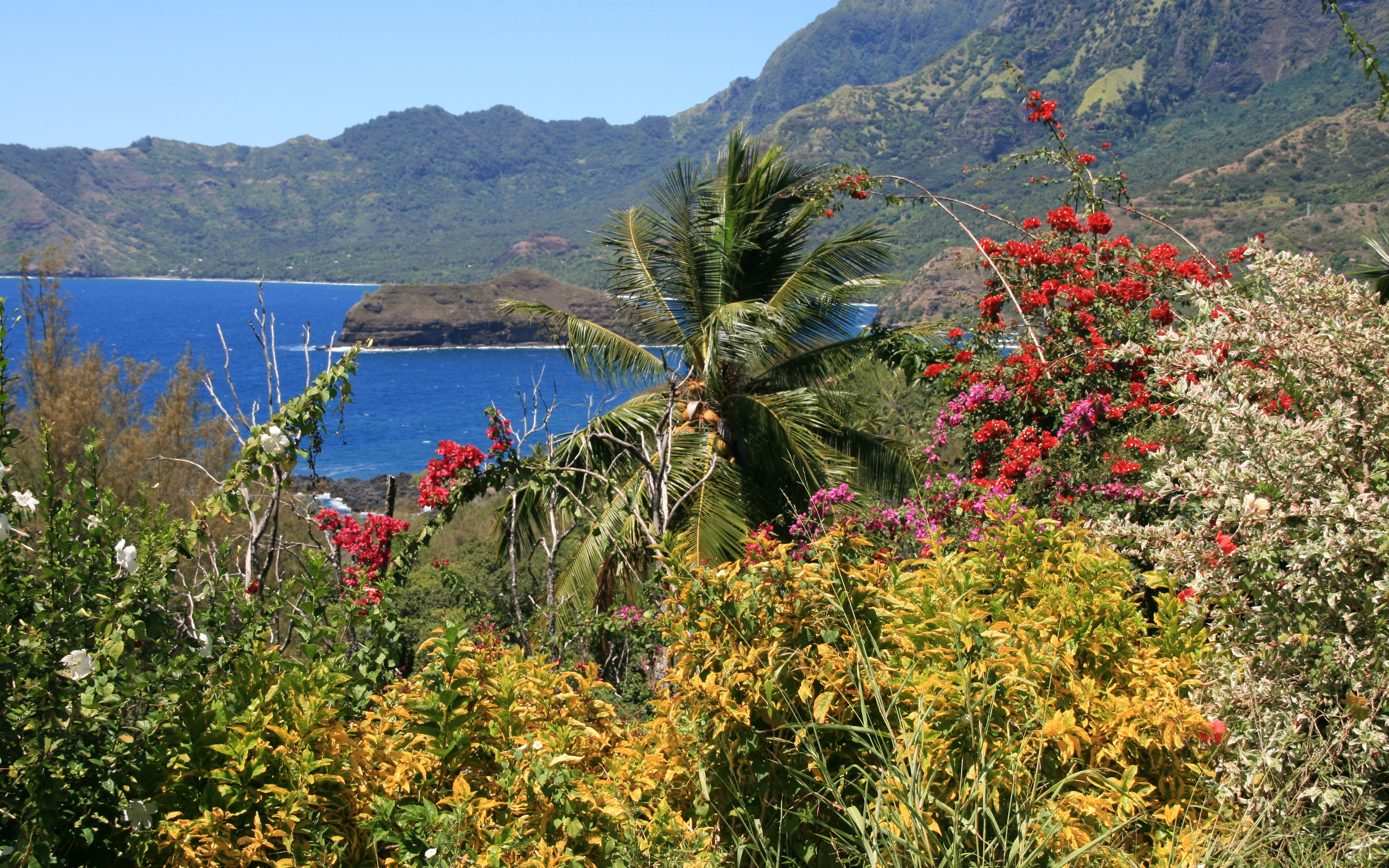
Hiva Oa

The Marquesas Islands group is one of the most remote in the world. It lies about 1,370 kilometres (850 mi) northeast of Tahiti and about 4,800 kilometres (3,000 mi) southwest of Mexico (the nearest continental land mass). It is thought to have been formed by a centre of upwelling magma, called the Marquesas hotspot. The islands in the group fall naturally into two geographical divisions. One is the northern group, consisting of Eiao, Hatutu (Hatutaa), Motu One, and the islands surrounding the large island of Nuku Hiva: Motu Iti, also called Hatu Iti; Ua Pou; Motu Oa; and Ua Huka. The other is the southern group, consisting of Fatu Uku, Tahuata, Moho Tani (Motane), Terihi, Fatu Hiva, and Motu Nao (also called Thomasset Rock), which are clustered around the main island of Hiva ʻOa.

The Marquesas are among the largest island groups in French Polynesia. Their combined land area is 1,049 square kilometres (405 sq mi). One of the islands in the group, Nuku Hiva, is the second-largest island in the entire territory (after Tahiti). With the exception of Motu One, all the islands of the Marquesas are of volcanic origin.

Although Polynesia tends to be associated with images of lush tropical vegetation, and the Marquesas lie within the tropics, they are remarkably dry. That is because they constitute the first major break for the prevailing easterly winds that arise from the (atmospherically) dry Humboldt Current. This subjects the Marquesas to frequent drought conditions. Only those islands that reach highest into the clouds (generally, higher than 750 metres (2,460 ft) above sea level) reliably have periods of precipitation. These conditions have historically led to periodic fluctuations in the availability of fresh water. Periodic lack of water has made human habitation only intermittently sustainable in certain parts of the various islands throughout the archipelago. For example, Ua Huka Island (maximum elevation 857 metres (2,812 ft)) has a history of low population levels, and Eiao Island (maximum elevation 576 metres (1,890 ft)) has been intermittently uninhabited.

=== Islands of the Marquesas ===
==== Northern Marquesas ====
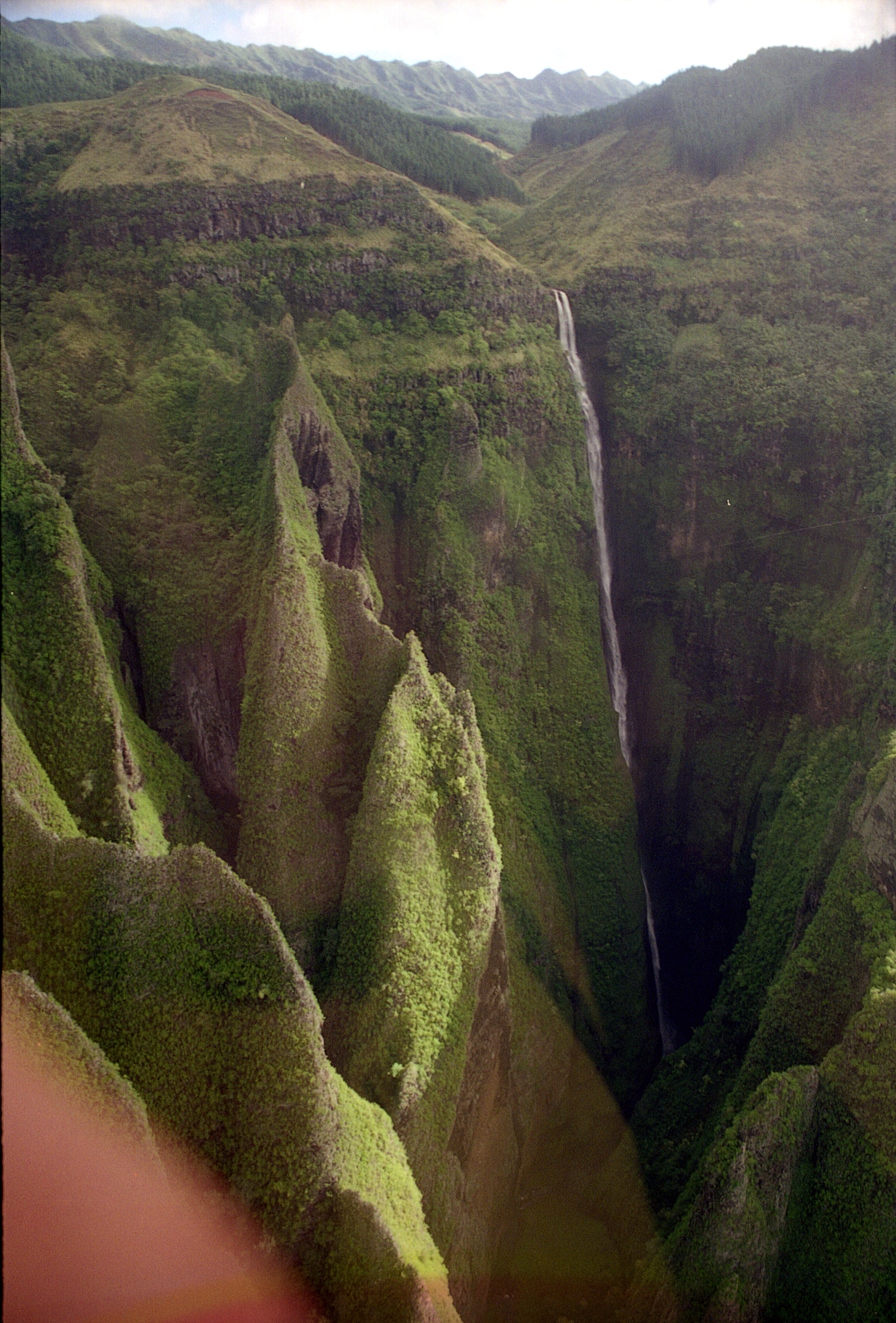
Hakaui waterfall, on Nuku Hiva island

- Eiao
- Hatutu
- Motu Iti
- Motu Oa
- Motu One
- Nuku Hiva
- Ua Huka
- Ua Pou

==== Southern Marquesas ====
- Fatu Hiva
- Fatu Huku
- Hiva ʻOa
- Moho Tani
- Motu Nao
- Tahuata
- Terihi

==== Seamounts ====
There are also a number of seamounts or shoals, located primarily in the area of the northern Marquesas. Among these are:

- Clark Bank
- Hinakura Bank
- Lawson Bank
- Bank Jean Goguel

=== Climate ===
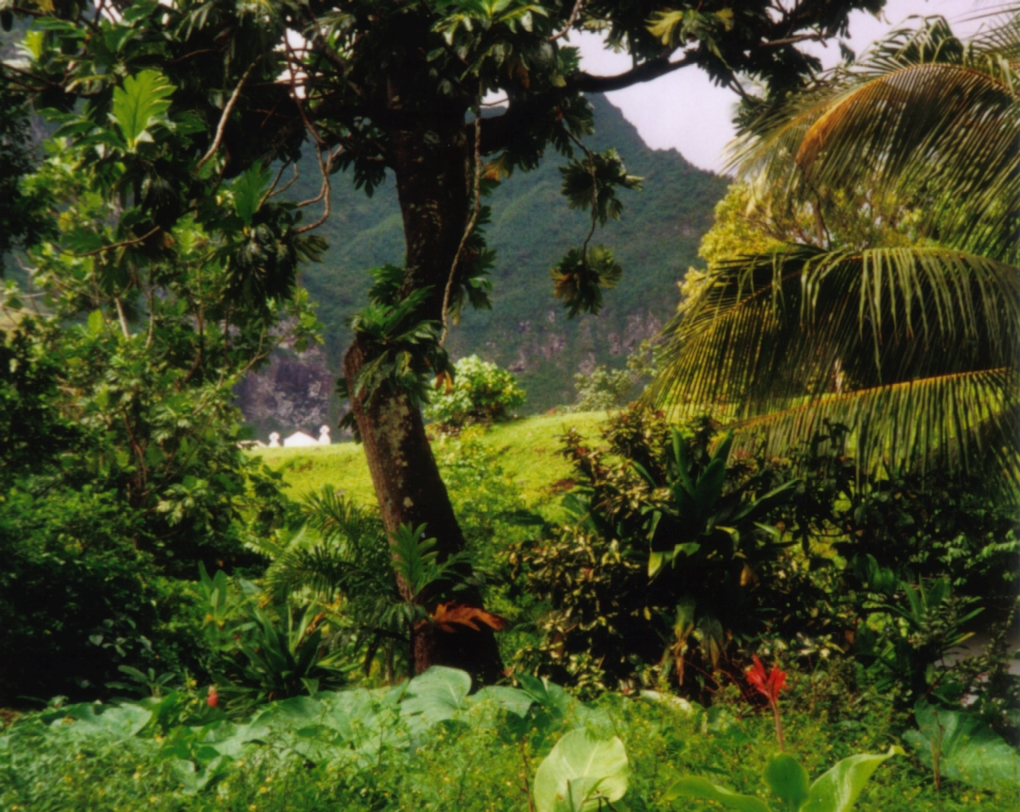
Breadfruit tree on Fatu-Hiva

Temperatures in the Marquesas are stable all year round. Precipitation is highly variable: greater in the northern and eastern (windward) coastal areas and mountains, averaging 2,500 mm (98 in) annually; much lower in the western (leeward) areas. Average annual precipitation in the "desert" region of Nuku Hiva is only 510 mm (20 in). Droughts are frequent, sometimes lasting several years, and seem to be associated with the El Niño phenomenon. The typical variability of the sea-level climate in the Marquesas is well illustrated by measurements made at the Atuona weather station on Hiva ʻOa: The highest recorded annual rainfall there is 3,760 mm (148 in); the lowest is 560 mm (22 in).

Climate data for Atuona, Hiva ʻOa
Month	Jan	Feb	Mar	Apr	May	Jun	Jul	Aug	Sep	Oct	Nov	Dec	Year
Mean daily maximum °C (°F)	30 (86)	31 (87)	31 (87)	31 (87)	29 (85)	29 (84)	28 (83)	28 (83)	29 (84)	29 (85)	30 (86)	30 (86)	29 (85)
Daily mean °C (°F)	27 (81)	27 (81)	28 (82)	28 (82)	27 (80)	26 (79)	26 (78)	26 (78)	26 (79)	26 (79)	27 (80)	27 (81)	27 (80)
Mean daily minimum °C (°F)	23 (74)	24 (75)	24 (76)	24 (76)	24 (75)	23 (74)	23 (74)	23 (73)	23 (73)	23 (73)	23 (74)	23 (74)	23 (74)
Average precipitation mm (inches)	110 (4.5)	91 (3.6)	140 (5.4)	120 (4.6)	120 (4.8)	180 (6.9)	120 (4.8)	100 (4)	81 (3.2)	79 (3.1)	66 (2.6)	89 (3.5)	1,290 (50.9)
Source: Weatherbase

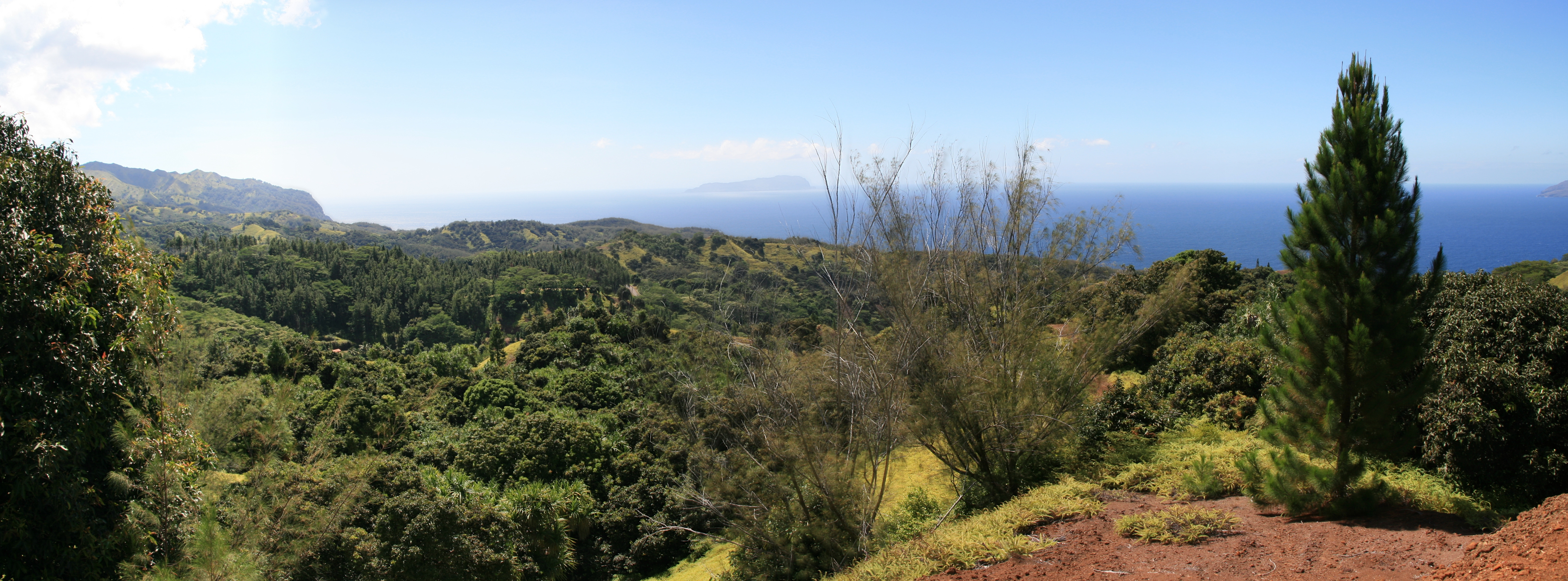
A view of Hiva Oa, towards the south-west, with Moho Tani island visible in the distance

== Geology ==
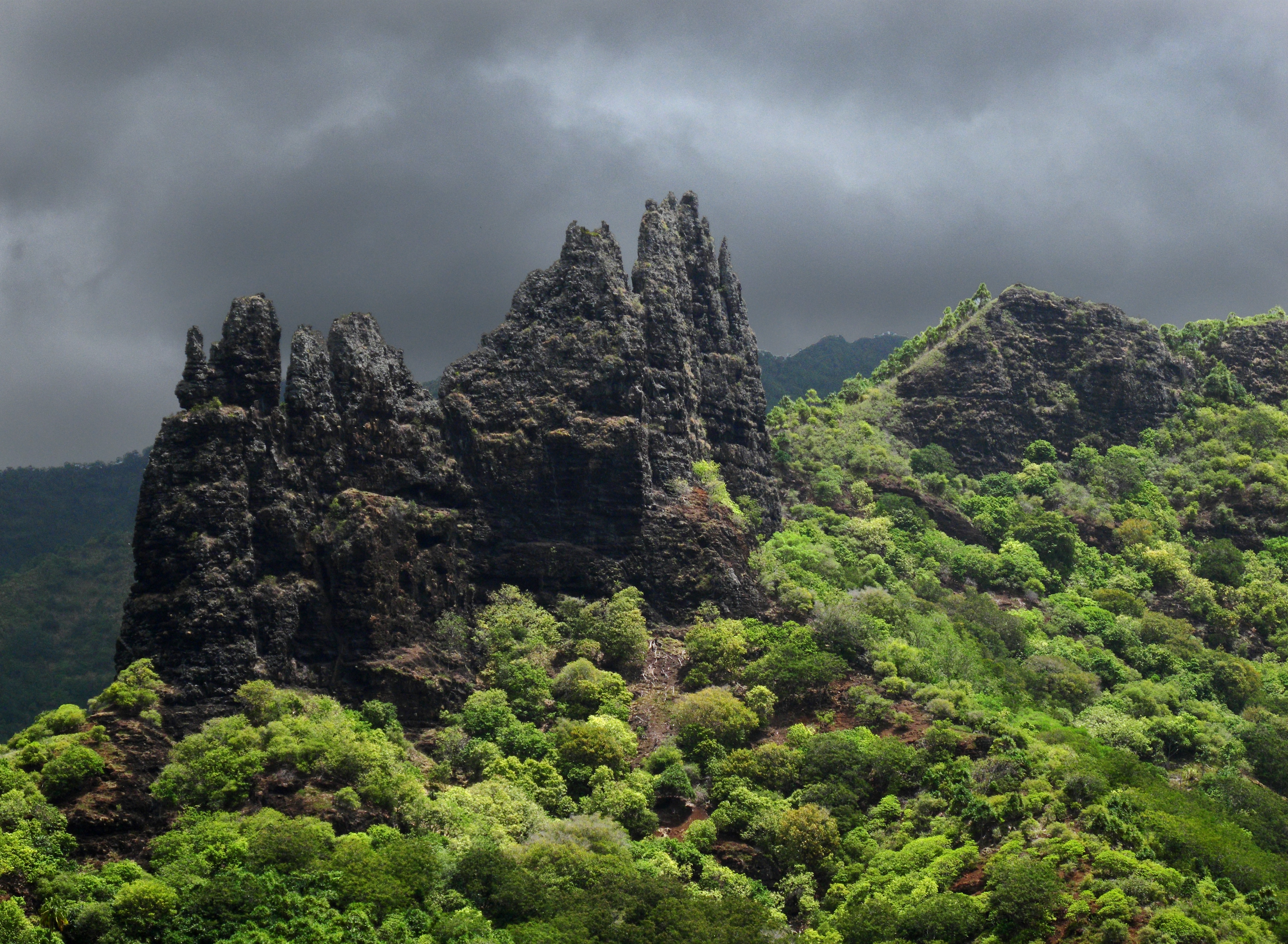
Basaltic rock formation in Hatiheu, Nuku Hiva island

Most of the Marquesas Islands are of volcanic origin, created by the Marquesas hotspot that underlies the Pacific Plate. The Marquesas Islands lie above a submarine volcanic plateau of the same name. The plateau, like the islands, is generally believed to be less than 5 million years old, though one hypothesis is that the plateau (not the islands) is significantly older, and has been formed by forces similar to those that have formed the Inca Plateau, which is subducting under northern Peru.

The Marquesas islands are estimated to range in age from 1.3 million years old (Fatu Hiva) to 6 million years old (Eiao). All of them except Motu One are volcanic islands. Motu One is a low island, consisting of a small sand bank on a coral reef, the only atoll in the Marquesas Islands. Unlike most French Polynesian islands, the Marquesas islands (other than Motu One) are not surrounded by protective fringing reefs. In those islands, coral is found only in bays and other protected areas, or, in the case of Fatu Huku, in an unusual place: in fossilized form at the top of the island. The South Equatorial Current lashes all these islands fiercely; its force has carved sea-caves that dot their shores. Although the islands have valleys that empty into small bays, they are remarkable for their mountain ridges, which end abruptly in cliffs at the edge of the sea.

== History ==
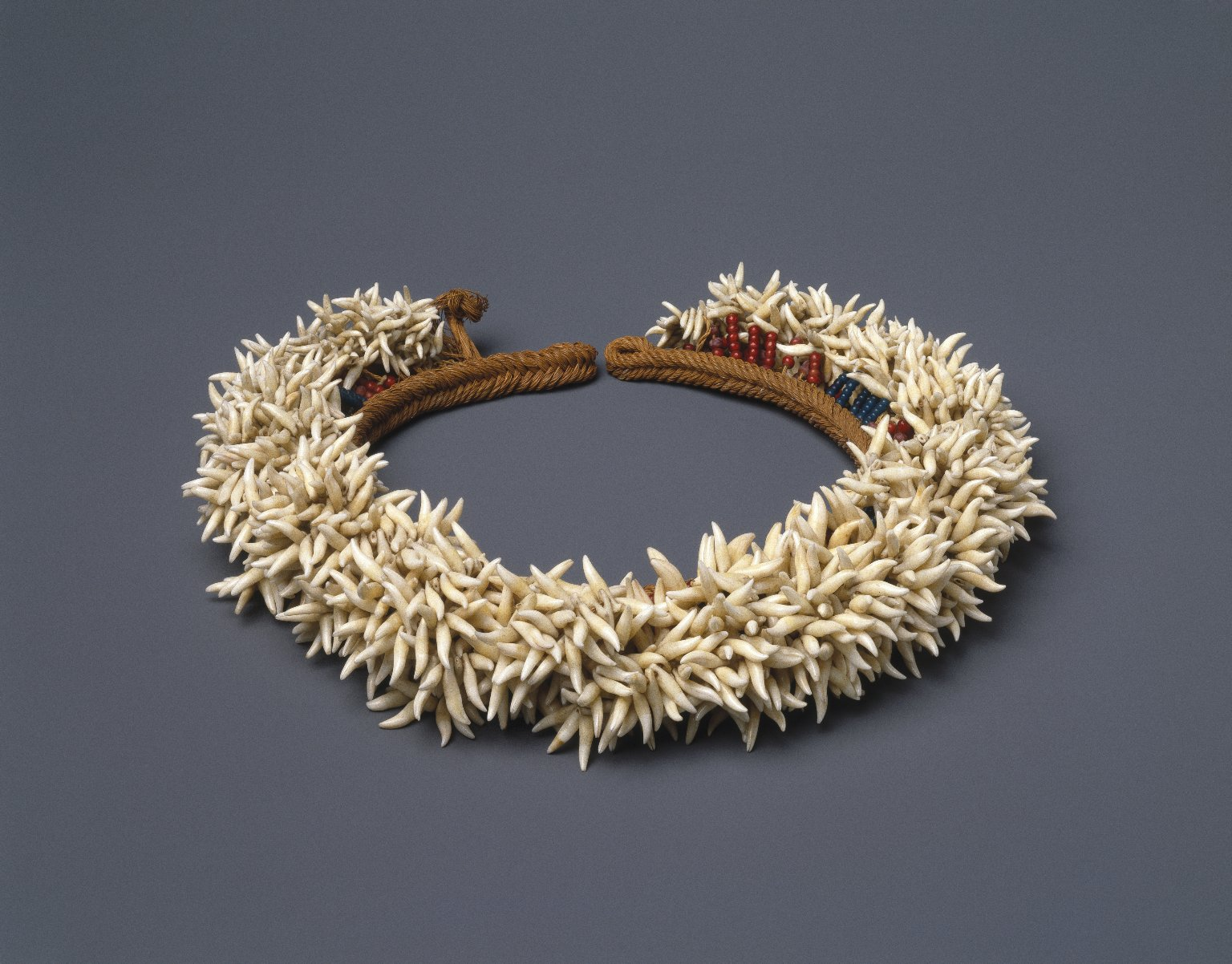
Kaimoko family. Headdress (Peueʻei), 19th century. Porpoise teeth, beads, coir. This woman's headdress was probably made on the island of Ua Pou, where porpoises abounded. In the Marquesan language, ei means "treasure". From the collection of the Brooklyn Museum.

The first recorded settlers of the Marquesas were Polynesians who arrived from West Polynesia, descendants of the Lapita Culture. Early attempts to carbon-date evidence from the site suggested they arrived before 100 AD, with other estimates proposing settlement from 600 AD, but several more recent independent studies suggest that they arrived more recently.

For example, a 2010 study that applied higher-precision radiocarbon dating methods to more reliable samples suggests that the earliest colonisation of eastern Polynesia took place much later, within a shorter time period, and in two waves: The first was a migration into the Society Islands between about 1025 and 1120 AD (four centuries later than had previously been thought); the second, between 70 and 265 years later, was a dispersal of migrants to all the remaining Marquesas islands between about 1190 and 1290 AD. This relatively rapid colonisation is believed to account for the "remarkable uniformity of East Polynesian culture, biology and language".

=== Historical culture ===
The richness of the natural resources in the islands has historically supported a large population. The inhabitants historically made a living by fishing, collecting shellfish, hunting birds, and gardening. They relied heavily on breadfruit but raised at least 32 other introduced crops. Hard evidence of significant pre-European interarchipelago trade has been found in basalt from the Marquesan quarry island of Eiao. It is known to have been distributed via sailing canoes over distances of more than 2,500 km (1,600 mi) to provide adze heads to Mo'orea (Society Islands), Mangareva (Gambier Islands), Tubuai (Austral Islands), Rarotonga (Cook Islands), and Tabuaeran (Northern Line Islands).

=== European contact ===
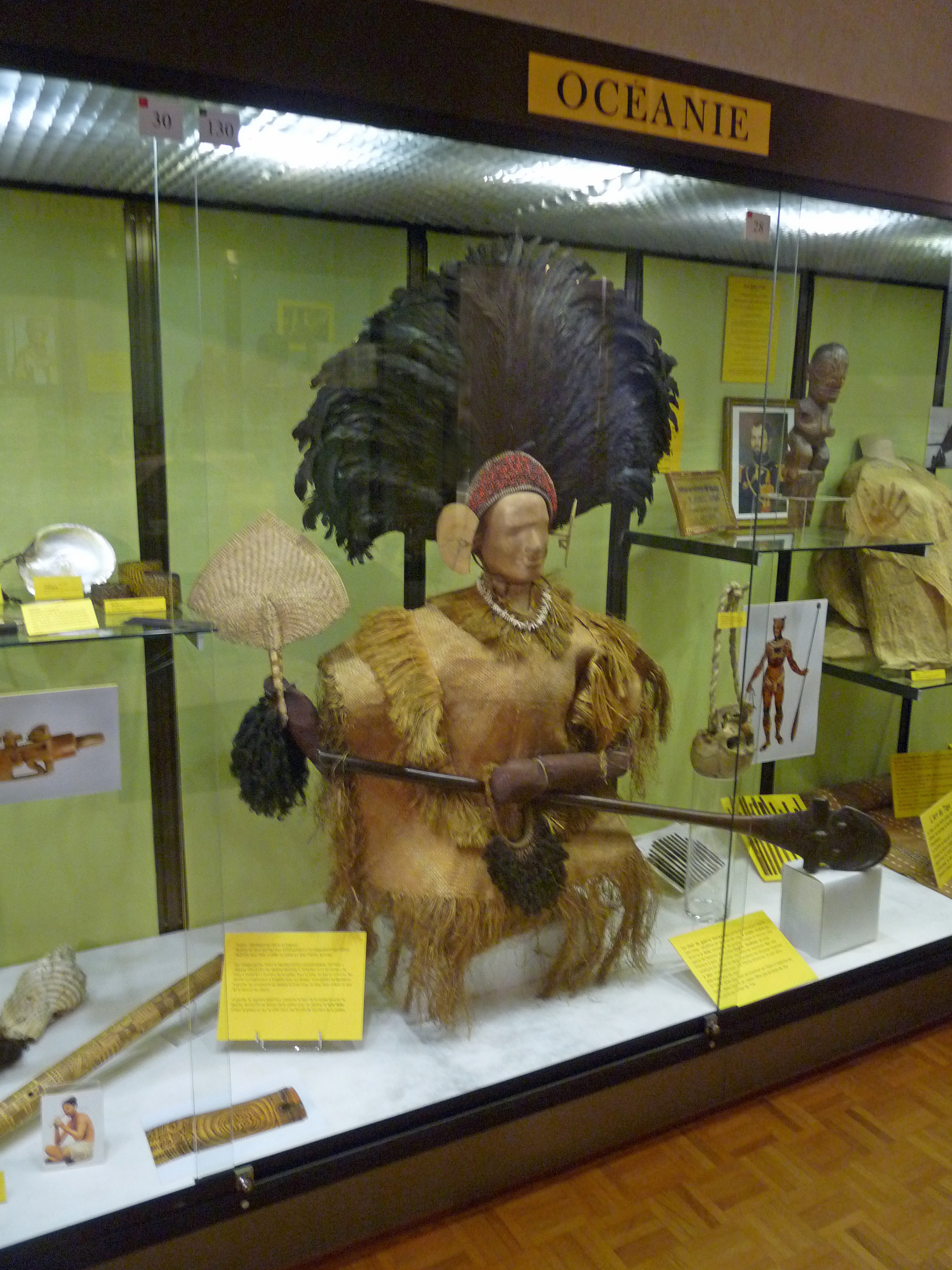
Traditional Marquesan warlord's headgear, ceremonial clothes, insignia, and weapon

The first Europeans to reach the Marquesas may have been the crew members aboard the San Lesmes, a Spanish vessel that disappeared in a storm in June 1526; it was part of an expedition headed by García Jofre de Loaísa. The Spanish explorer Álvaro de Mendaña reached them nearly 70 years later, on 21 July 1595. He named the islands after his patron, García Hurtado de Mendoza, 5th Marquis of Cañete (Spanish: Marqués de Cañete), who served as Viceroy of Peru from 1590 to 1596. Mendaña visited first Fatu Hiva and then Tahuata before continuing on to the Solomon Islands. His expedition charted the four southernmost Marquesas as Magdalena (Fatu Hiva), Dominica (Hiva ʻOa), San Pedro (Moho Tani), and Santa Cristina (Tahuata).

In the late 18th century, European explorers estimated that the population was 80,000 to 100,000. Europeans and Americans were impressed with how easy life appeared to be in the islands, which had a rich habitat and environment. In 1791, the American maritime fur trader Joseph Ingraham first visited the northern Marquesas while commanding the brig Hope. He named them the Washington Islands. From 1797 to 1799, William Pascoe Crook became the first Protestant missionary to live in the Marquesas. In 1813, Commodore David Porter claimed Nuku Hiva for the United States, but the United States Congress never ratified that claim. For a brief period the islands exported sandalwood, but the resource was depleted within four years.

The islands were a popular port of call for whaling ships in the Age of Sail. The first on record to visit was the Hope, in April 1791. The last known such visitor was the American whaler Alaska in February 1907.

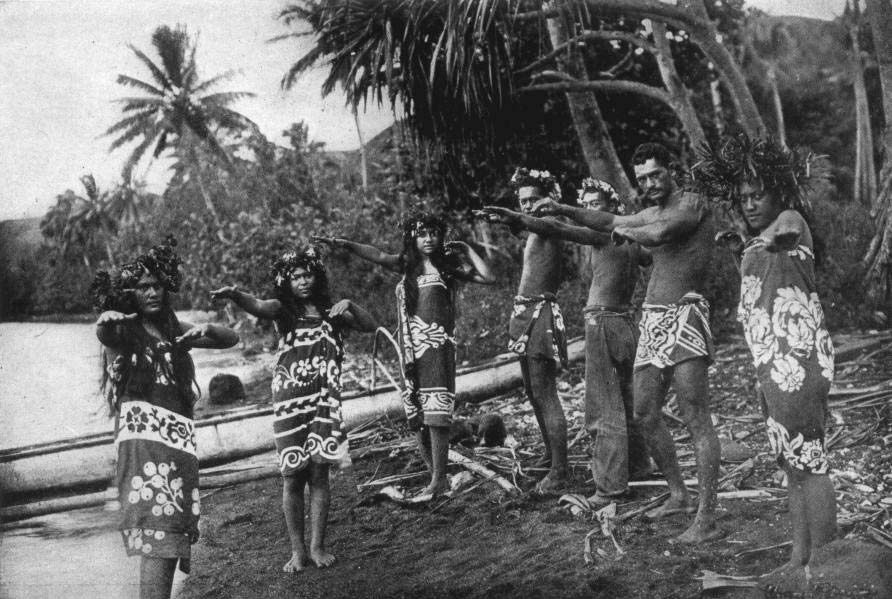
Marquesans dressed in pareu demonstrating traditional dance, 1909

In 1842, France conducted a successful military operation in support of the native chief Iotete's claim that he was king of the whole island of Tahuata. The French government then laid claim to the whole island group and established a settlement on Nuku Hiva. That settlement was abandoned in 1857, but France re-established control over the group in 1870. It later incorporated the Marquesas into French Polynesia.

The indigenous people of the Marquesas suffered high death rates from diseases carried by Western explorers, such as smallpox and measles, because none of them had any immunity to them.

The Marquesas lost more people to death from these diseases than any other island group in Polynesia. The population shrank from over 78,000 inhabitants in the 18th century to about 20,000 by the middle of the 19th century, and to just over 4,000 by the beginning of the 20th century, reaching an all-time low of 2,255 in 1926. After that, the population started to increase, reaching 8,548 by the time of the November 2002 census (not including the Marquesan community residing in Tahiti), and 9,346 by the time of the August 2017 census.

=== Contemporary history ===
In 2024, the Marquesas Islands were listed as a UNESCO World Heritage Site under "Te Henua Enata" (lit. 'The Land of Men'), as part of the committee's commitment to conservation efforts protecting indigenous populations.

== Government and politics ==
The Marquesas Islands form one of the five administrative divisions (subdivisions administratives) of French Polynesia. French and Tahitian are the official languages of government. The capital of the Marquesas Islands administrative subdivision is the settlement of Taioha'e on the island of Nuku Hiva.

The sparsely populated Marquesas Islands are located 1,371 km (852 mi) from Tahiti. With 183,645 inhabitants (2012 census), Tahiti is the most populous island of French Polynesia, containing 68.5% of the total population of the grouping.

Residents of the Marquesas have chafed at Tahiti's overwhelming dominance, complaining of neglect by politicians based in Tahiti, and leaders have suggested developing a direct relationship with the metropole, the government in Paris, instead of depending on Papeete. As sentiment was rising in Tahiti in the 21st century for independence from France, several prominent Marquesan political leaders in 2007 floated the idea of the Marquesas Islands separating from French Polynesia but remaining within the French Republic. This has generated controversy in Tahiti, where pro-independence Tahitian leaders have accused the French central government of encouraging the separation of the Marquesas Islands from French Polynesia.

== Administration ==
=== Community of communes of the Marquesas Islands (CODIM) ===
The Marquesas Islands do not have a provincial or regional assembly, but since 2010 the six communes (municipalities) into which the Marquesas Islands are divided have gathered to form an intercommunality, the community of communes of the Marquesas Islands (in French: communauté de communes des îles Marquises, or CODIM). As all communities of communes in France, the CODIM is not a full-fledged territorial collectivity, but only a federation of communes (in French Polynesia, only the overseas collectivity of French Polynesia and the 48 communes are territorial collectivities). The CODIM is governed by a president and by a community council (conseil communautaire), which is made up of 15 delegates elected by the municipal councils of the six communes among their members, with each commune having a number of delegates proportional to the size of its population. The president of the CODIM and the community council have their offices in Atuona, on the island of Hiva Oa. The current president is Benoît Kautai, mayor of Nuku Hiva, who was elected president by the community council in July 2020 after the 2020 French municipal elections and is due to serve for six years until the next municipal elections.

The community of communes of the Marquesas Islands was created in 2010 with the aim of delegating powers both from the six communes and from the overseas collectivity of French Polynesia to this new intercommunal structure, due to the isolation of the Marquesas Islands and distance from the seat of the French Polynesian government in Tahiti. The government of French Polynesia transferred to the CODIM the power to oversee economic development. As a result, the CODIM is now in charge of drafting a blueprint for local economic development. The French Polynesian government also transferred to the CODIM the power to grant subsidies in favor of cultural and sports activities. Transfers of powers from the six communes to the CODIM have been extremely limited. Besides drafting a blueprint for economic development and granting subsidies for cultural and sports activities, the CODIM is currently in charge only of creating hiking trails, drafting studies for waste collection (but not actually managing waste collection, which the communes kept for themselves), drafting a blueprint for transports between the islands of the archipelago, acquiring computers and office equipment for the six communes of the archipelago, and offering legal and technical support to the six communes.

The French Polynesian public auditor (chambre territoriale des comptes) has pointed out that the actions of the CODIM have been very limited and fallen short of its theoretical powers due to a very small budget (less than 100 million Pacific Francs, i.e. less than US$1 million). For example, the CODIM has not exercised its power to acquire computers and office equipment for the six communes of the archipelago, and more generally its creation has not led to a pooling of resources and expenses by the six communes. Most of the CODIM's budget has been spent on drafting a blueprint for local economic development, but the CODIM has neither the power nor the financial means to implement the blueprint and build the required infrastructure. The public auditor has called for an expansion of the powers and financial resources of the CODIM.

=== Deconcentrated administrations ===
Administratively, the Marquesas Islands form a deconcentrated subdivision of both the French central State and the government of French Polynesia. As a deconcentrated subdivision of the French central State, the Marquesas Islands form the administrative subdivision of the Marquesas (French: subdivision administrative des Marquises), one of French Polynesia's five administrative subdivisions. The head of the administrative subdivision of the Marquesas is the administrateur d'État ("State administrator"), generally simply known as administrateur, also sometimes called chef de la subdivision administrative ("head of the administrative subdivision"). The administrateur is a civil servant under the authority of the High Commissioner of the French Republic in French Polynesia in Papeete. The administrateur and his staff sit in Taioha'e, on the island of Nuku Hiva, which has become the administrative capital of the Marquesas Islands, having replaced Atuona on the island of Hiva ʻOa, which was previously the capital (although, in reverse to this general trend, Atuona was selected as the seat of the community of communes of the Marquesas Islands in 2010).

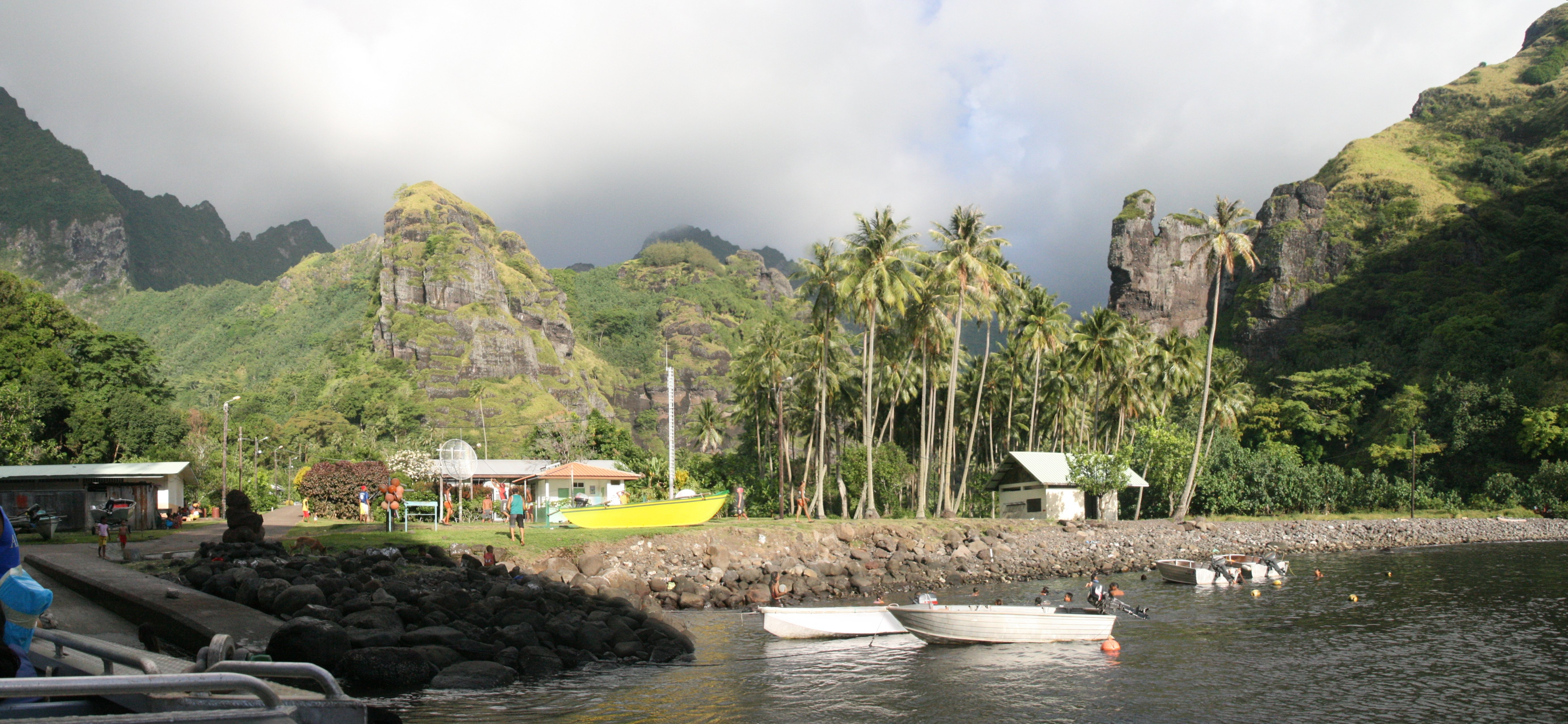
Hanavave

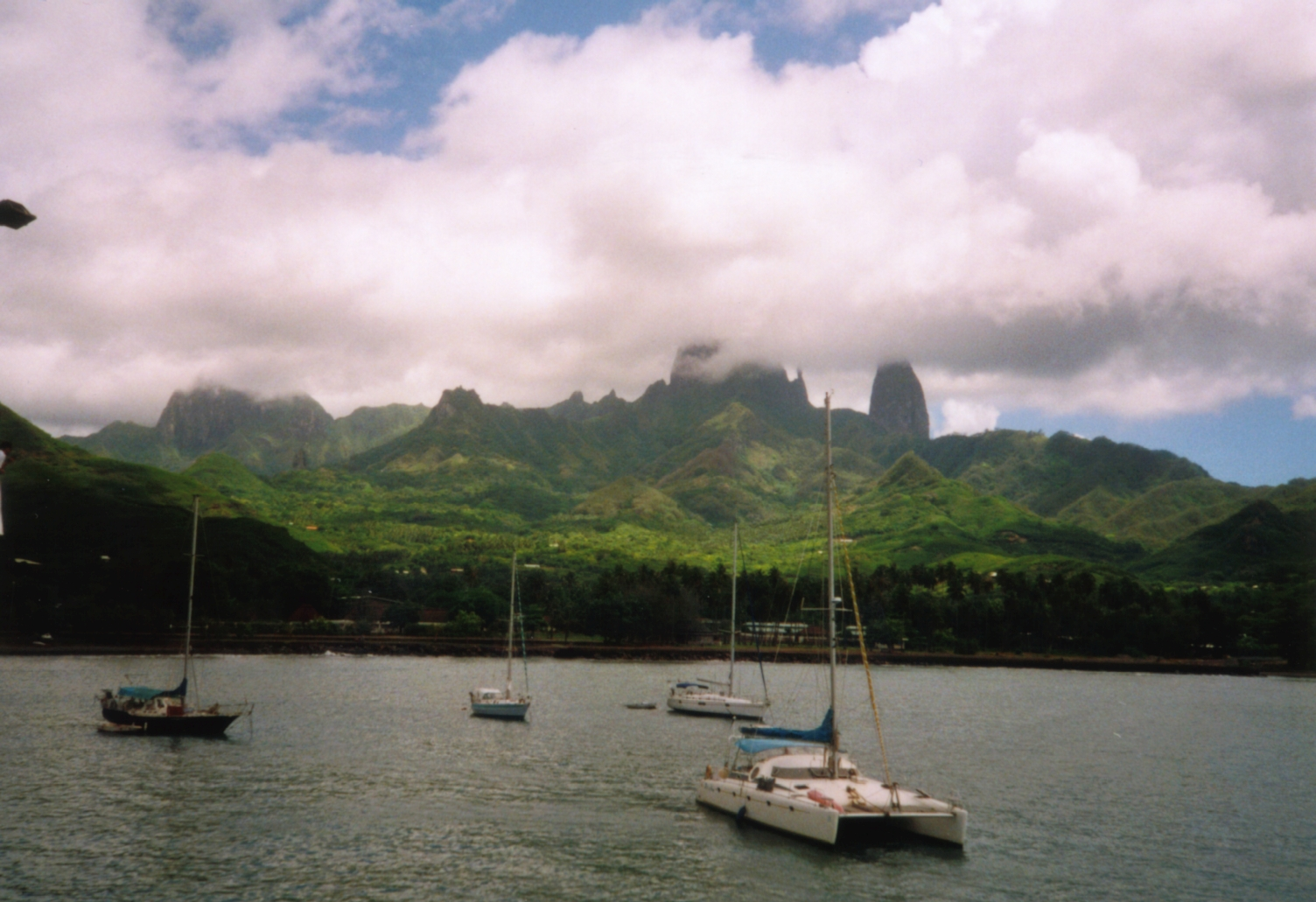
View of Hakahau, Ua Pou, from the sea

Acting as the representative of the French central State and delegate of Papeete's High Commissioner, the administrateur of the Marquesas is in charge of:

- Offering legal advice to the communes (municipalities) of the Marquesas and verifying the legality of decisions made by the communes
- Issuing official documents (ID cards, driving licences, etc.), applying immigration rules, organising elections
- Managing security (coordination of gendarmerie forces, handling of major crises such as natural disasters, etc.)
- Overseeing public services of the French central State in the Marquesas Islands (such as the correctional facility on Nuku Hiva)

As a deconcentrated subdivision of the government of French Polynesia, the Marquesas Islands form the circonscription des Marquises ("district of the Marquesas"), one of French Polynesia's four circonscriptions ("districts") created in 2000 by the Assembly of French Polynesia to serve as deconcentrated subdivisions of the government of French Polynesia in the islands away from Tahiti and Moorea. The head of the circonscription des Marquises is the tavana hau, known as administrateur territorial in French ("territorial administrator"), but the Tahitian title tavana hau is most often used. The tavana hau is the direct representative of the president of French Polynesia's government who appoints him. The tavana hau and his staff sit in Taioha'e on Nuku Hiva, same as the State administrator.

The tavana hau is in charge of:

- Coordinating the work of French Polynesian administrations in the Marquesas Islands (such as the French Polynesian administrations in charge of roads, fisheries, etc.)
- Ensuring the enforcement of acts passed by the Assembly of French Polynesia and decisions taken by the government of French Polynesia
- Evaluating the performance of French Polynesian civil servants and sending the evaluations to the responsible ministries in Papeete
- Acting as a liaison between the local population and the government of French Polynesia in Papeete

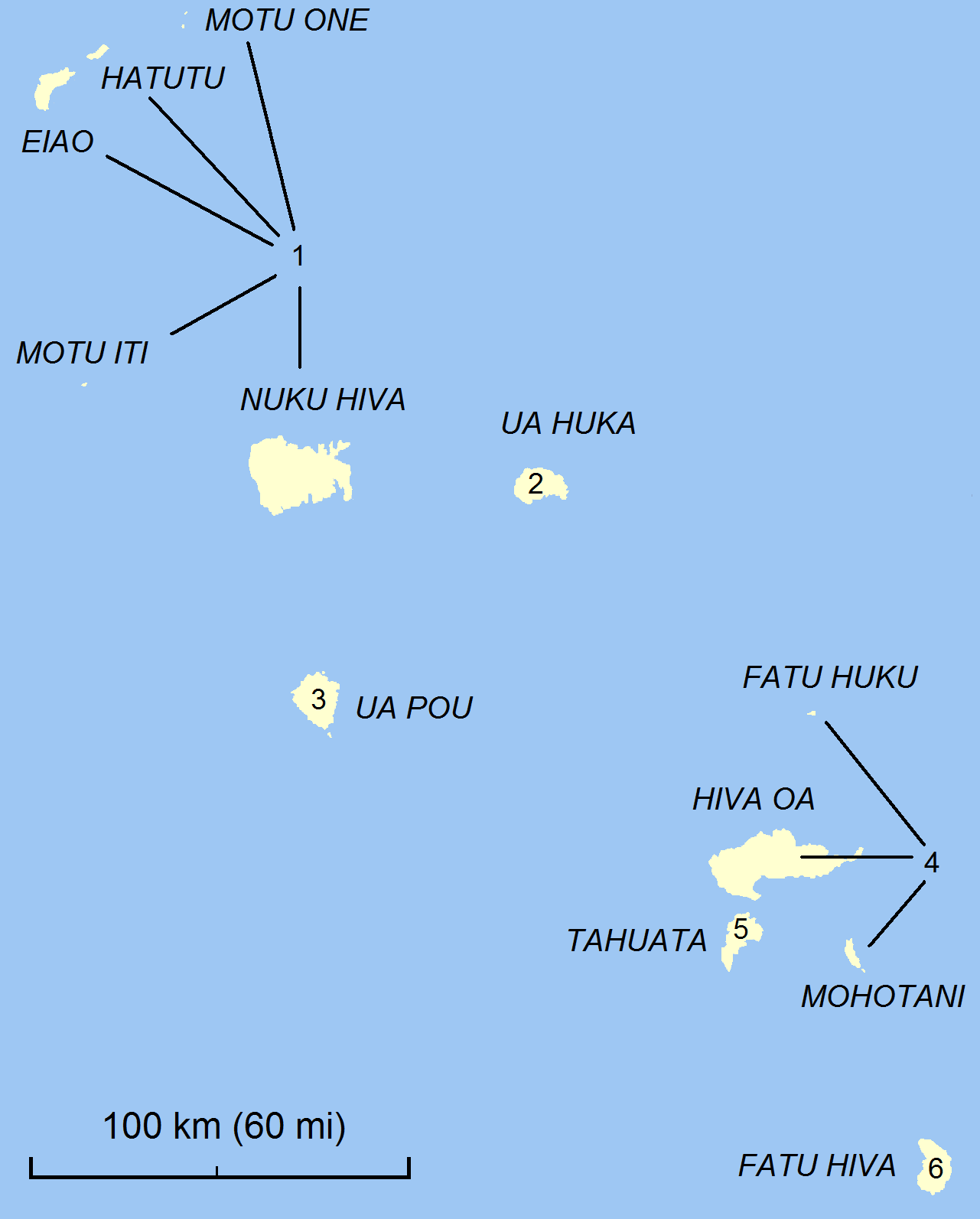
Communes of the Marquesas Islands

The Marquesas Islands also form the electoral district of the Marquesas Islands, one of French Polynesia's six electoral districts for the Assembly of French Polynesia (see also Politics of French Polynesia).

=== Communes ===
The Marquesas Islands are subdivided in six communes (municipalities). In each of the six communes the local residents with either a French or another EU citizenship elect a municipal council and a mayor in charge of managing local affairs within the commune. Three communes (Nuku-Hiva, Ua-Pou, and Hiva-Oa) are further subdivided into associated communes due to their larger population. The communes and associated communes are the only elected councils in the Marquesas since there does not exist a provincial or regional assembly for the entire archipelago (the community council of the CODIM (community of communes of the Marquesas Islands) is not directly elected by local residents, but is only made up of delegates chosen by the municipal councils of the six communes). Municipal elections are held every six years on the same day as municipal elections in the rest of France (see 2020 French municipal elections for the last municipal elections). Each municipal council then selects delegates among its members to sit in the community council of the CODIM in Atuona (on the island of Hiva Oa).

The areas and populations of the communes at the 2012 Census were as follows:

- Nuku-Hiva (388 km^{2}): 2,966
- Ua-Pou (106 km^{2}): 2,173
- Ua-Huka (83 km^{2}): 621
- Hiva-Oa (327 km^{2}): 2,190
- Tahuata (61 km^{2}): 703
- Fatu-Hiva (85 km^{2}): 611
- Total (1,049 km^{2}): 9,264

== Demographics ==
=== Historical population ===
1799	1853	1863	1872	1883	1892	1902	1911	1921	1926	1931	1936
50,000 to 100,000	11,900	8,650	6,045	5,576	4,445	3,963	3,116	2,300	2,255	2,283	2,400
1946	1956	1962	1971	1977	1983	1988	1996	2002	2007	2012	2017
2,976	4,165	4,838	5,593	5,419	6,548	7,358	8,064	8,548	8,632	9,264	9,346
Past estimates and official figures from past censuses.

=== Migrations ===
The places of birth of the 9,346 residents of the Marquesas Islands at the 2017 census were the following:

- 63.2% were born in the Marquesas Islands (down from 70.5% at the 2007 census)
- 29.2% in Tahiti (up from 20.9% at the 2007 census)
- 4.0% in Metropolitan France (down from 4.5% at the 2007 census)
- 2.5% in French Polynesia (other than the Marquesas Islands and Tahiti) (down from 3.0% at the 2007 census)
- 0.8% in foreign countries (up from 0.6% at the 2007 census)
- 0.3% in overseas France (other than French Polynesia) (down from 0.5% at the 2007 census)

Between the 2007 and 2017 censuses, the population of residents of the Marquesas Islands born in Tahiti rose by 50.5% (from 1,810 at the 2007 census to 2,726 at the 2017), and as a result, they made up 29.2% of the population in 2017. A lot of these arrivals from Tahiti, however, are children of Marquesans who had migrated to Tahiti and given birth there, and whose children are returning to the Marquesas, as can be seen in the language statistics: 50.8% of the Marquesas Islands' residents whose age was 15 or older and who were born in Tahiti and lived in the Marquesas at the 2017 census reported that the language they spoke the most at home was Marquesan, whereas 42.1% reported French, and only 6.6% reported Tahitian.

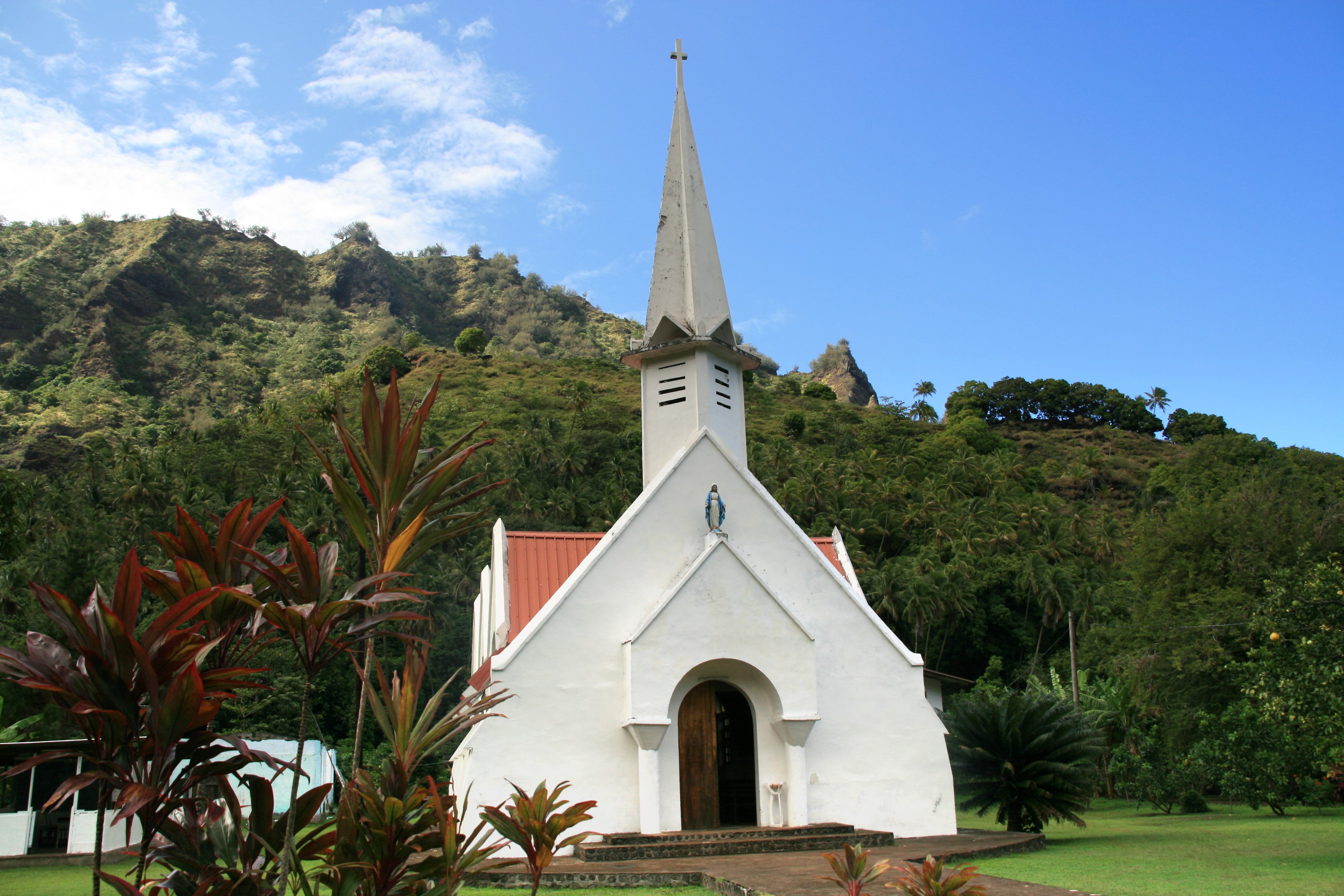
Church of Our Lady of Peace (French: Église de Notre-Dame-de-Paix), Omoa, Fatu-Hiva

3,353 people born in the Marquesas Islands lived on the island of Tahiti at the 2017 census (down from 3,493 at the 2007 census), whereas 5,907 people born in the Marquesas Islands lived in the Marquesas (down from 6,106 at the 2007 census), and 705 lived in the rest of French Polynesia (up from 679 at the 2007 census). The total number of people born in the Marquesas Islands and living in French Polynesia decreased from 10,278 at the 2007 census to 9,965 at the 2017 census, as net births were not able to offset the departures to New Caledonia and Metropolitan France due to the economic crisis experienced by French Polynesia.

=== Religion ===
Most of the population of the Marquesas Islands is Christian as a result of successful missionary activity from the Catholic Church, and various Protestant Christian groups. The main church in the area is the Cathedral of Our Lady of Taioha'e (French: Cathédrale Notre-Dame de Taiohae), seat of the Catholic Diocese of Taioha'e (Latin: Dioecesis Taiohaënus seu Humanae Telluris).

According to 2017 data 90.1% of the population of the Marquesas Islands was affiliated with the Catholic Church, an increase from 1950 when Catholics formed 87.3% of population of the islands.

Although the Mendaña ships had chaplains on board, there does not appear to have been any serious attempt at missionary work in the Marquesas Islands. The first missionaries to arrive in the Marquesas from 1797, coming from England via Tahiti, were William Pascoe Crook (1775–1846) and John Harris (1754–1819) of the London Missionary Society. Harris could not endure the conditions at all and returned to Tahiti only a few months later. A contemporary report says that he was picked up on the beach, utterly desperate, naked and looted. Crook remained until 1799.

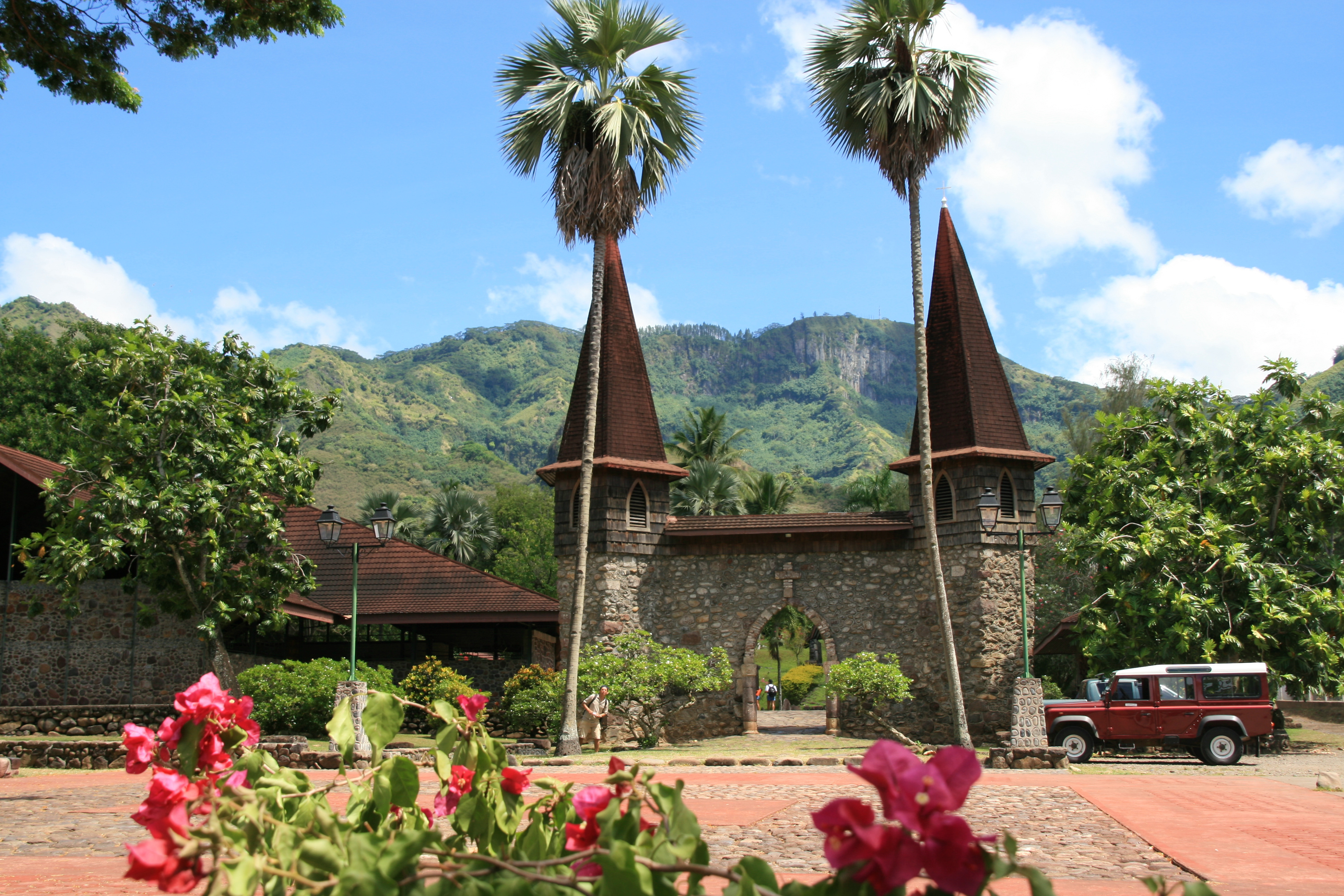
Cathedral of Our Lady of the Marquesas Islands (French: Cathédrale Notre-Dame des Îles Marquises), Nuku Hiva

The American mission from Hawaii was no more successful. William Patterson Alexander (1805–1864), Benjamin Parker (1803–1877), and Richard Armstrong (1805–1860) arrived in the Marquesas in 1834 from Hawaii with their wives and a three-month-old baby. They returned the same year. In 1853, more missionaries led by James Kekela (1824–1904) arrived at Fatu Hiva with their wives from Hawaii, but were unable to remain there because of clashes with Catholic missionaries arriving on a French warship.

Protestants went to Hiva Oa, and also had little success. There were few converts; tribal warfare, cannibalism and human sacrifice continued. Protestant missionaries gradually left Hiva Oa and returned to Hawaii, and only James Kekela remained. In 1899, he returned to Hawaii, dying in Honolulu on 29 November 1904. Hawaiian-born missionary James Bicknell translated the Gospel of John into the Marquesan language in 1857.

From 1838 to 1839, the Catholic mission was able to establish itself, supported by the French order Pères et religieuses des Sacrés-Cœurs de Picpus (founded in 1800). The missionaries spread from Mangareva to Tahuata, Ua Pou, Fatu Hiva and Nuku Hiva. They suffered the same hostile tribal reception as the previous Protestants. However, with the support of the French authorities, they were able to sustain themselves in the long run, despite the obstacles. They even managed to baptize King Moana of Nuku Hiva who, however, would die of smallpox in 1863.

The missionaries in many ways worked to introduce Christian ideals and culture to eventually replace the traditional, tribal culture. Not only were the Christians disapproving of the long-enjoyed consumption of kava and the ancient and sacred tattoo artwork, but they especially disapproved tribal fertility/virility rites and skull dissection. However, they also tried – and finally succeeded – at putting an end to cannibalism, human sacrifice and constant tribal warfare.

=== Language ===
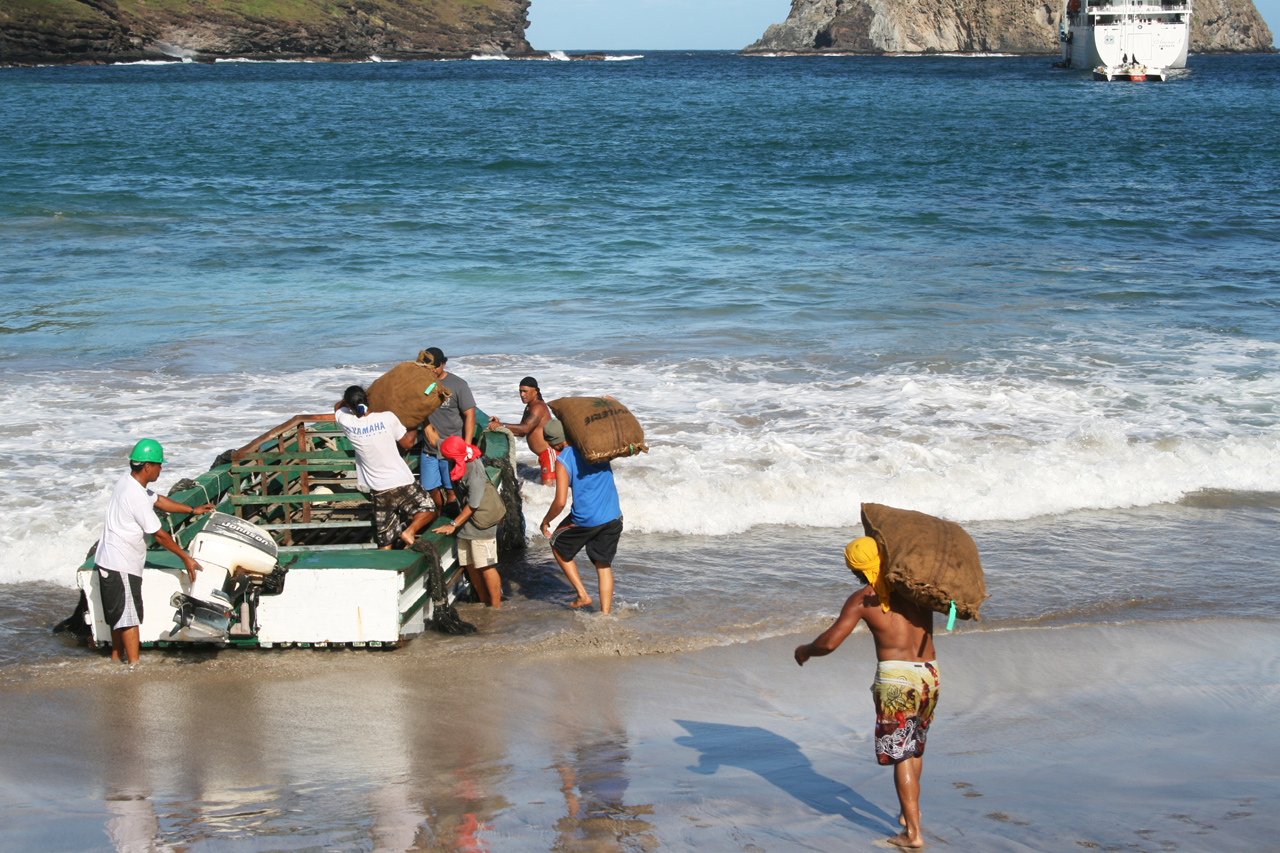
Loading copra on a boat in the bay of Hane, Ua Huka island

French and Tahitian are the official languages of all of French Polynesia, but the Marquesan languages, in their various forms, remain the primary means of communication among residents within this archipelago. In addition, knowledge of French is now almost universal among residents of the Marquesas Islands (see census data below).

Marquesan is a collection of East-Central Polynesian language dialects, of the Marquesic group, spoken in the Marquesas Islands of French Polynesia. They are usually classified into two groups, North Marquesan and South Marquesan, corresponding roughly along geographic lines.

The North Marquesan dialects are spoken on the islands of Ua Pu and Nuku Hiva, and South Marquesan dialects on the islands of Hiva ʻOa, Tahuata and Fatu Hiva. The dialects of Ua Huka are often incorrectly classified as North Marquesan; they are instead transitional. While the island is in the northern Marquesas group, the dialects show more morphological and phonological affinities with South Marquesan. The North Marquesan dialects are sometimes considered to be two separate languages: North Marquesan and Tai Pi Marquesan, the latter being spoken in the valleys of the eastern third of the island of Nuku Hiva, in the ancient province of Tai Pi.

The most striking feature of the Marquesan languages is their almost universal replacement of the /r/ or /l/ of other Polynesian languages by a /ʔ/ (glottal stop).

Like other Polynesian languages, the phonology of Marquesan languages is characterised by a paucity of consonants and a comparative abundance of vowels.

==== Language data in 2017 census ====
At the 2017 census, 97.0% of the population whose age was 15 and older reported that they could speak French (up from 94.1% at the 2007 census). 92.6% reported that they could also read and write it (up from 90.2% at the 2007 census). Only 1.9% of the population whose age was 15 and older had no knowledge of French (down from 4.4% at the 2007 census).

At the same census, 66.9% of the population whose age was 15 and older reported that the language they spoke the most at home was Marquesan (down from 67.8% at the 2007 census). 30.2% reported that French was the language they spoke the most at home (up from 30.1% at the 2007 census). 2.3% reported Tahitian (up from 1.4% at the 2007 census), and 0.6% reported another language (down from 0.7% at the 2007 census).

4.9% of the population whose age was 15 and older reported that they had no knowledge of any Polynesian language at the 2017 census (down from 7.2% at the 2007 census).

== Communications ==
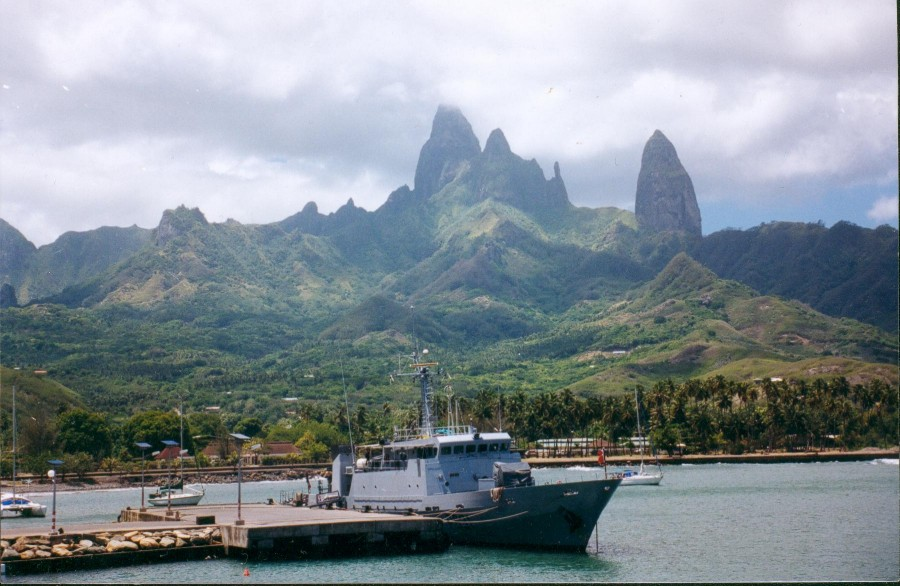
P400-class patrol vessel La Tapageuse docked at Hakahau, Ua Pou island

=== Airports ===
There are four airports in the Marquesas, one each on the islands of Nuku Hiva, Ua Pou, Ua Huka, and Hiva ʻOa. The terrain of Tahuata is too irregular to allow for the construction of a landing strip without significant investment, and while the upland plateau of central Fatu Hiva is large enough to permit the construction of an airstrip, the island's minuscule population makes such an exercise of dubious benefit.

=== Telecommunications ===
The Marquesas are served by telephone as well as by radio and television, mainly from Tahiti. Recent additions include Vini, a mobile phone service that is a commercial subsidiary of the public OPT Polynesia, the sole provider of fixed telephony in most of Polynesia. Over a period of about six years, Vini has expanded to cover most of the populated islands.

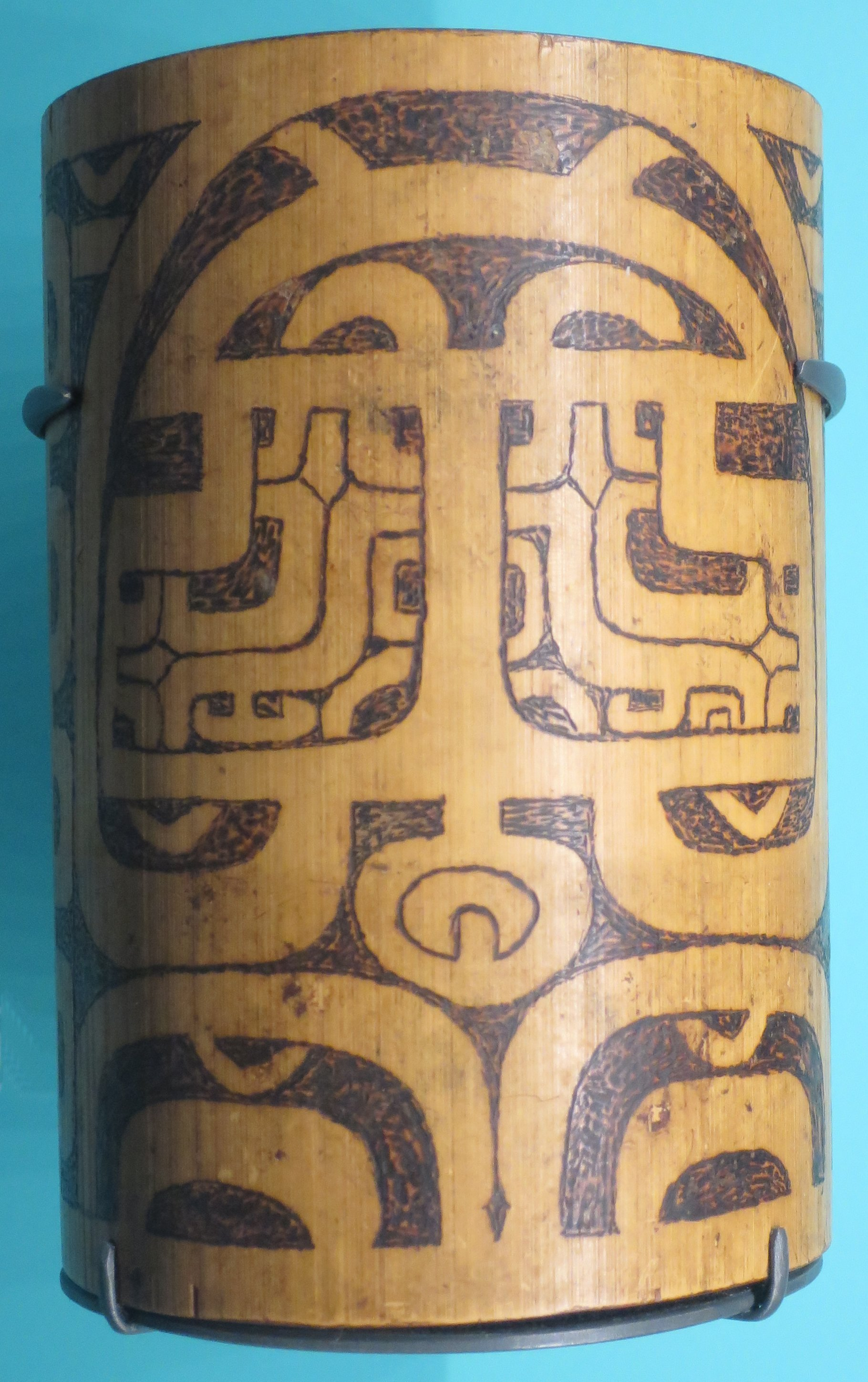
Container for tattoo tools, wood, Pua Mau Valley, Atuona, Hiva Oa island

== Art and culture ==
The Marquesas Islands have a rich tradition of art. Art of the Marquesas ranges from large wooden sculptures of ancestors created for temples to small, intricate personal ornaments made from bone and shell. Carved wooden objects were decorated in elaborate anthropomorphic and geometric motifs, similar to tattoo designs that are part of a traditional practice.

== Biology ==
The ecosystem of the Marquesas has been devastated in some areas by the activities of feral livestock. As a first step in preserving what remains, the Marquesan Nature Reserves were created in 1992.

In 1996 Lucien Kimitete, the Mayor of Nuku Hiva, proposed that the Marquesas become a UNESCO World Heritage Site. In May 2022 public consultations on their listing began. The French government formally lodged an application with UNESCO in January 2023. Te Henua Enata was inscribed on UNESCO's World Heritage List on 31 July 2024.

== See also ==
- Administrative divisions of France
- List of French islands in the Indian and Pacific oceans
- Overseas France
- Politics of French Polynesia
- Survivor: Marquesas
