= UTC−09:30 =

Time zone used in French Polynesia

- Time zone
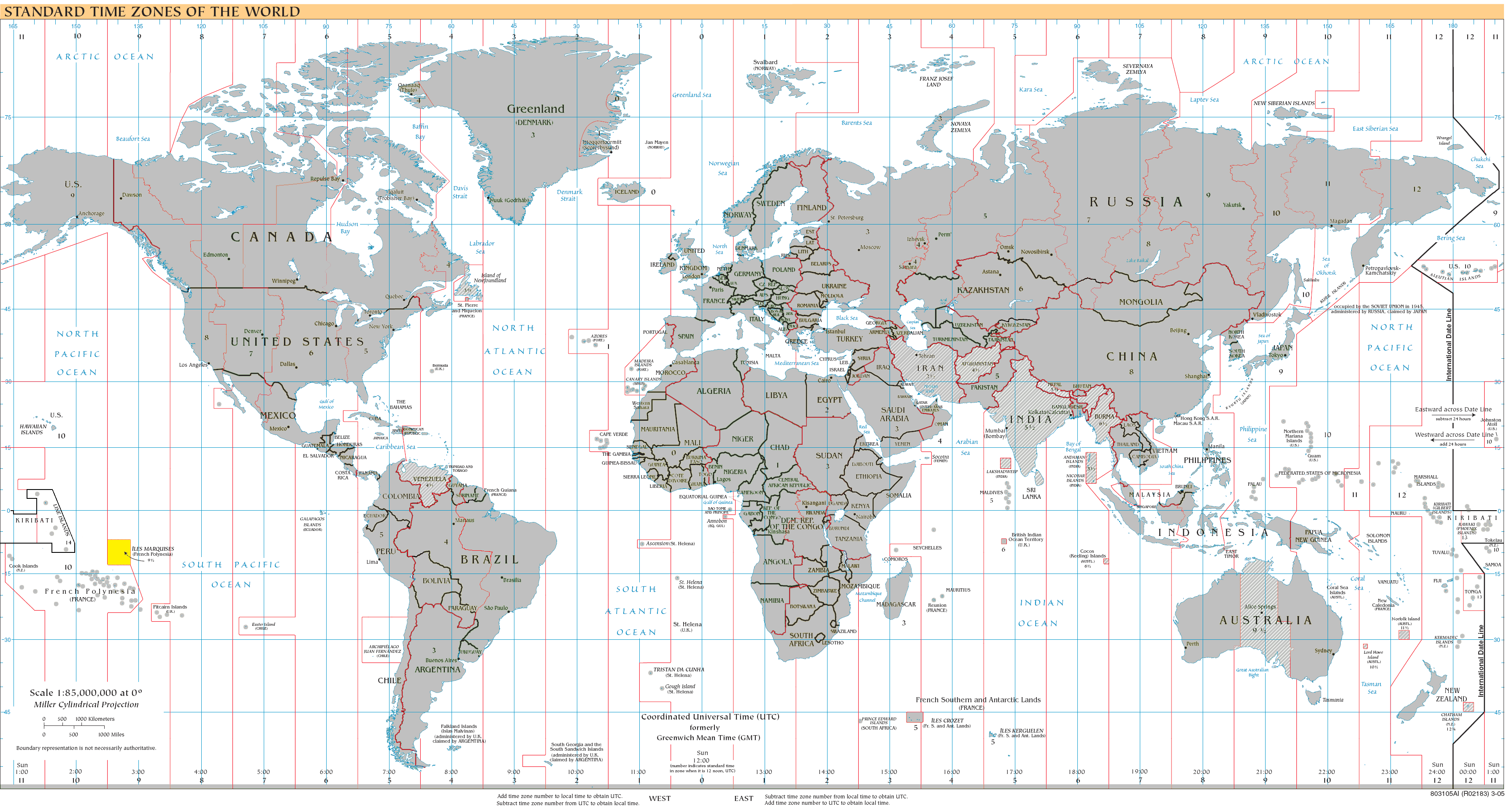
- World map with the time zone highlighted

UTC offset
- UTC: UTC−09:30

Current time
- 07:15, 26 March 2025 UTC−09:30 [refresh]

Central meridian
- 142.5 degrees W

Date-time group

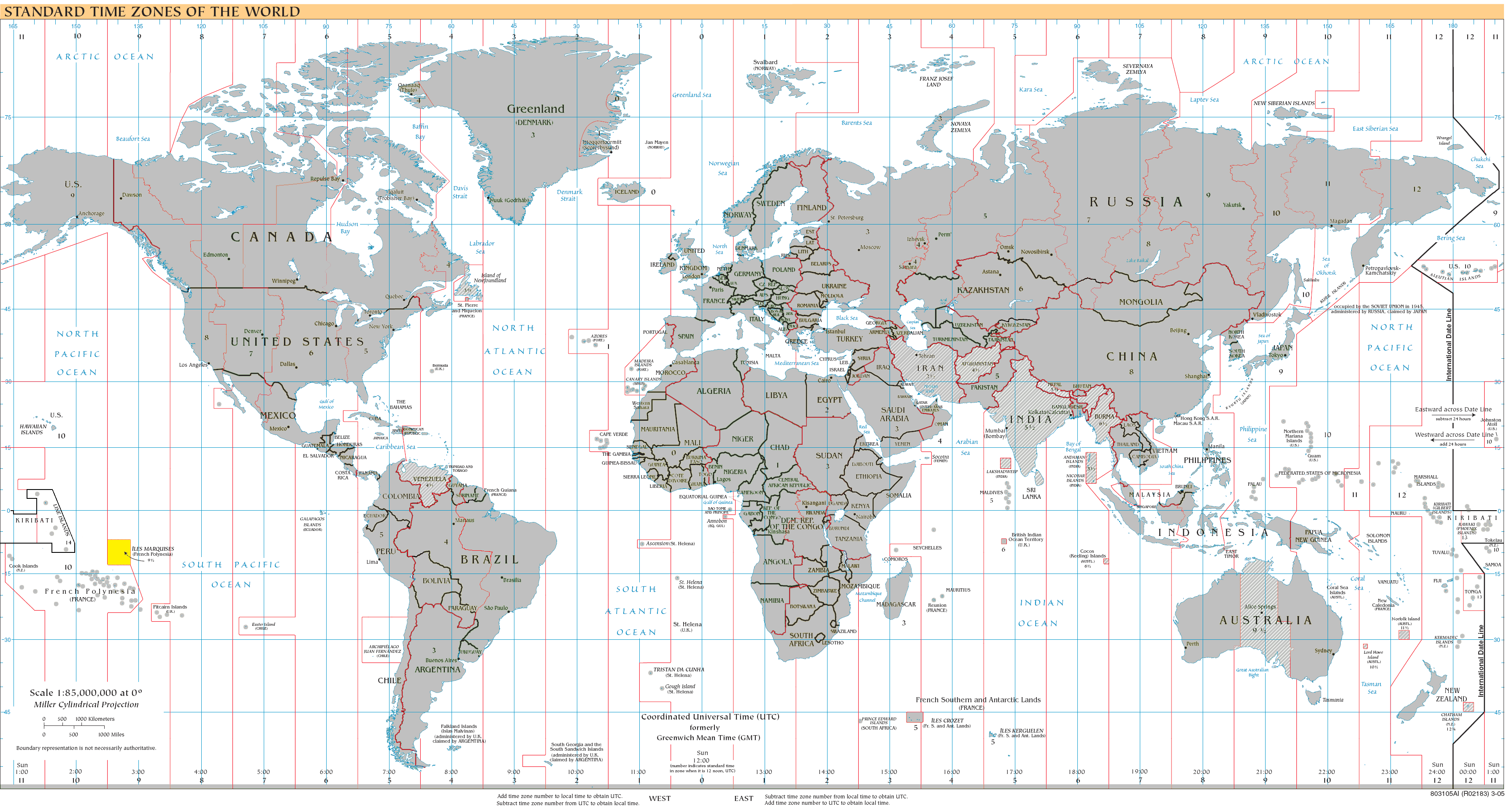
UTC−09:30: blue (December), orange (June), yellow (year-round), light blue (sea areas)

UTC−09:30 is an identifier for a time offset from UTC of −09:30. This time is used on the Marquesas Islands in French Polynesia.

== As standard time (year-round) ==
Principal settlement: Taiohae

=== Oceania ===
==== Pacific Ocean ====
===== Polynesia =====
- France
  - French Polynesia
    - Marquesas Islands
      - Northern Marquesas
      - Southern Marquesas
