= Caloptilia insidia =

Scientific classification
- Kingdom: Animalia
- Phylum: Arthropoda
- Clade: Pancrustacea
- Class: Insecta
- Order: Lepidoptera
- Family: Gracillariidae
- Genus: Caloptilia
- Species: C. insidia

Binomial name
- Caloptilia insidia J.F.G.Clarke, 1986

Species of moth

Caloptilia insidia is a moth of the family Gracillariidae, one of the most primitive groups of ditrysian "micromoths". Within its family, it belongs to the subfamily Gracillariinae. It is apparently endemic to Fatu Hiva and Hiva Oa in the Marquesas Islands, French Polynesia. It is very similar (and presumably closely related) to C. deltanthes. The species does not seem to be common, and no females appear to have been encountered yet.

== Description ==
C. insidia is a small moth, with a wingspan of about 12 mm (c.0.5 in) and an overall reddish coloration; males and females look alike externally. The head and thorax are light brownish purple, except for the facial area which is a buff color. The labial palps are the same color on the outside and on the underside of the third segment; otherwise, they are light buff. The antennae are grey, though the scape is the same purplish color as most of the head and thorax. The abdomen is reddish above, and a glossy buff on the underside. The legs are also light brownish purple, except for the midleg tarsi and the hindleg femur which are buff, shading to grey towards the tip in the former case.

The forewing color is mainly the same brownish-purple as the dominant body color; its bright yellow markings resemble those of C. deltanthes but are less extensive. From the wing base, an oblique narrow triangle extends to the wing's trailing edge. Just before the center of the leading edge, a narrow band runs across the wing to the trailing edge, where it tapers to a point. A spot of the same yellow color is located near the tornus. The wings have a hairy fringe, which is the same as the background color in the forewings, except at the wingtip and the adjacent outer edge, where it is buff. The hindwings are reddish-brown, with the fringe of the same color.

The female genitals are still unknown. In the male, the clasper's harpe is simple, slim at the base but widening towards the broadly truncated cucullus with its bluntly pointed upper end; the uncus is likewise bluntly pointed. The vinculum is long and triangular; the tegumen is also long (twice as long as wide) and moderately sclerotized (hardened). The anellus is comparatively little sclerotized, a mere little plate of uneven shape. The long aedeagus is straight, slim and ends in a point; the vesica is unarmed.

== Ecology ==
Only a handful of these moths – all males as it seems – have even been found. The holotype USNM 100840 was collected on March 1, 1968, on Mount Feani, Hiva Oa, at an altitude of about 750 m (2500 ft) ASL (presumably between Atuona and the summit of Temetiu), and further specimens were collected on southern Fatu Hiva at a similar altitude; the species thus seems to live mainly in the uplands. The larval foodplant(s) are unknown; in its habitat, native plants such as Bidens henryi, Cheirodendron bastardianum, Pandanus, East Polynesian blueberry (Vaccinium cereum) and lichens and mosses are still plentiful.
