= Taʻa ʻOa =

Coordinates: 9.826°S 139.029°W

Taʻa ʻOa is the South Marquesan name of a wide bay on the southern coast of Hiva ʻOa in French Polynesia. The bay is widely known in English as the Bay of Traitors, and in French as Baie des Traitres.

The highest point on Hiva ʻOa, Temetiu, rises above the western end of the bay.

Atuona, the administrative center of the southern Marquesas, is located on a small inlet, Atuona Bay (called Vevau in Marquesan), on the north shore of Ta‘a ‘Oa. The western extensions of Ta'a Oa are separated from Atuona Bay by a small rock called Hanakee. One of the best harbors in the Marquesas Islands, Taha Uku, is also located on the northern shore, near the eastern end of the bay, separated from Atuona Bay by a headland called Feki.

== See also ==
- French Polynesia
- Marquesas Islands
