= Calvary Cemetery (Atuona) =

Cemetery in French Polynesia

Coordinates: 9.8006°S 139.0382°W

Calvary Cemetery (French: Cimetière Calvaire) is the main cemetery in Atuona, Hiva ‘Oa, French Polynesia. It is located on a hillside on the eastern edge of town, overlooking the anchorage on Atuona Bay.

The cemetery is the final resting place of French Post-Impressionist painter Paul Gauguin, as well as of Belgian singer Jacques Brel.

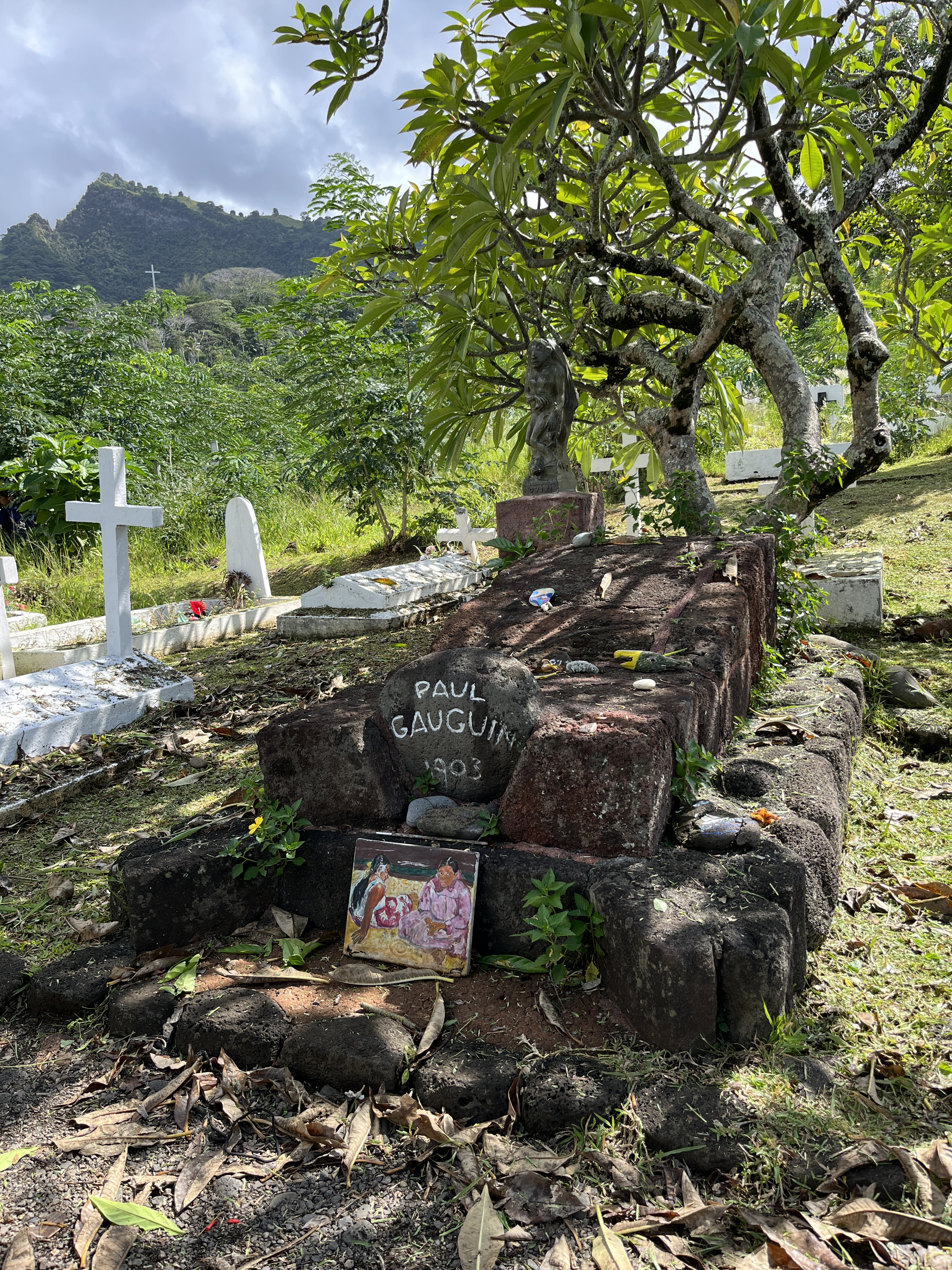
Tomb of Paul Gauguin

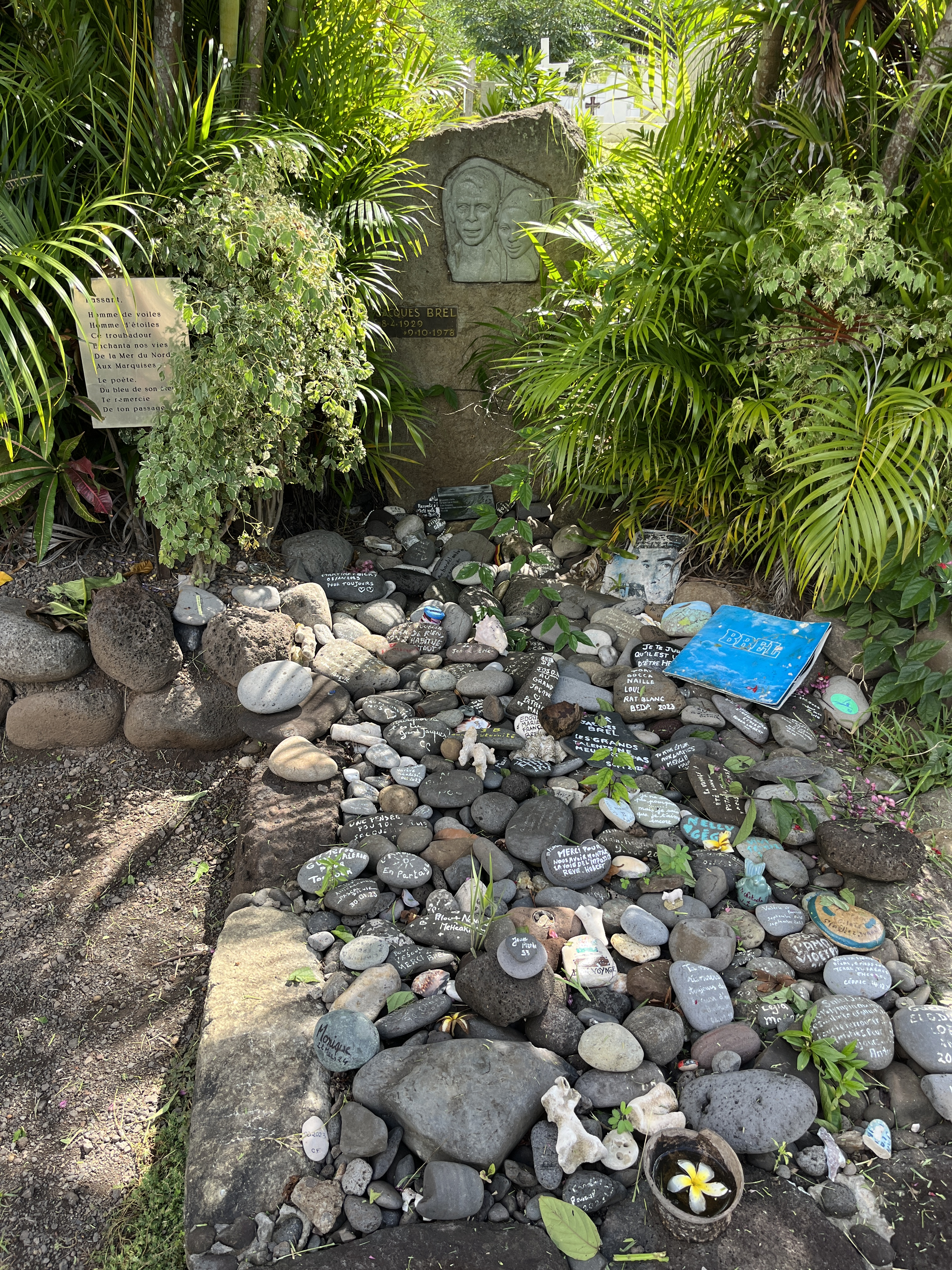
Tomb of Jacques Brel

== See also ==
- Marquesas Islands
- French Polynesia
- Paul Gauguin Cultural Center
