= Atuona Bay =

Inlet in French polynesia

Coordinates: 9.808°S 139.039°W

Atuona Bay (French Baie d'Atuona or Baie Tahauku) is a small inlet on the north shore of Ta‘a ‘Oa (the Bay of Traitors), on the southern coast of Hiva ‘Oa. The bay is traditionally called Vevau in Marquesan.

At the head of the bay lies Atuona, chief town of the southern Marquesas Islands.

Atuona Bay is separated from the harbor of Taha Uku to its east, by a headland called Feki, and from westernmore extensions of Ta'a Oa by a small rock called Hanakee.

== Related article ==
- French Polynesia
