= Hanakee =

Islet in French Polynesia

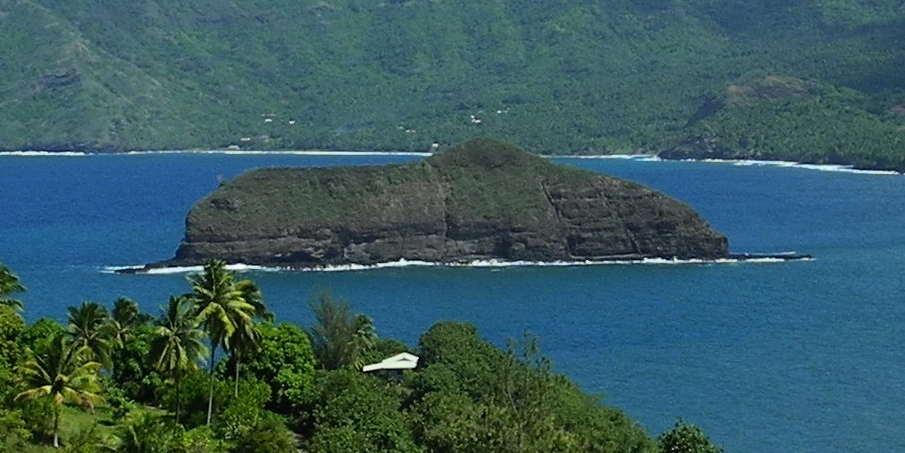
- Hanakee as seen from the northeast
- Interactive map of Hanakee

Geography
- Location: Ta'a 'Oa
- Coordinates: 9.8151°S 139.0402°W
- Area: 1.24 km^{2} (0.48 sq mi)

Administration
- France
- Overseas country: French Polynesia

Hanakee or Motu Hanakee is a small rocky islet lying off the southern coast of Hiva Oa in French Polynesia, separating Atuona Bay from Taʻa ʻOa.

== Description ==
The island's only vegetation is some small shrubs and grasses.

On the north side of the islet, small patches of shallow coral extend for 10 metres (11 yd). On the south side, steeper and rockier reefs can be found.

== Wildlife ==
Hanakee is an Important Shark and Ray Area (ISRA). The area surrounding the island in a major feeding area for the reef manta ray. The rays are also seen cleaning in the waters around Hanakee, in the largest aggregation in the Marquesas Islands. Apart from reef manta rays, giant oceanic manta rays, spotted eagle rays, and blotched fantail rays have also been observed in the area.

== Archaeology ==
The islet was inhabited by early Polynesians, and remnants of traditional ceremonial platforms and other archaeological sites have been found.

== See also ==
- Marquesas Islands
