= Haʻava =

Coordinates: 9.874°S 139.073°W

Ha‘ava is the Marquesan name of the 4 km (2.5 mi.) wide channel that separates Tahuata from Hiva Oa, in the southern Marquesas Islands. The French name for the passage is Canal du Bordelais.

The seas generally move through the channel at speeds of one to two knots. Given the prevailing westerly trade winds of the region and the funneling effect of the two islands on either side of the channel, Hiva Oa and Tahuata, wind speeds in the channel are often 10%-30% higher than east of the channel, which, together with the sudden rise in the seafloor in the channel from thousands of meters outside of it to around 100 meters within it, there is often significant wave chop through the channel. West to east passage through the channel is possible for sailing vessels under power in most conditions, even with wind speeds above 25 knots, however, it is recommended that the vessel's motor generally be able to maintain a boatspeed of 7+ knots, to ensure the vessel will be able to make it through the channel against the wind and current in a reasonable amount of time. In the event of engine failure or other inability to complete the passage through the channel, a sailing vessel can find anchorage and refuge in the leeward bays of Tahuata, the largest of which has the village of Vaihatu, where a troubled vessel can seek assistance from the local inhabitants. An alternative to transiting the channel west to east to arrive at the main harbor of Hiva Oa, Atuona, is either to pass around the north and east of Hiva Oa, or to pass south of Tahuata and then tack north with prevailing winds on the beam to starboard. This approach carries the risk of making the entire eastern side of Tahuata a leeward shore with no protected anchorages to fall back on for the entire 15-20 mile leg from the south tip of Tahuata to Atuona' harbor.
