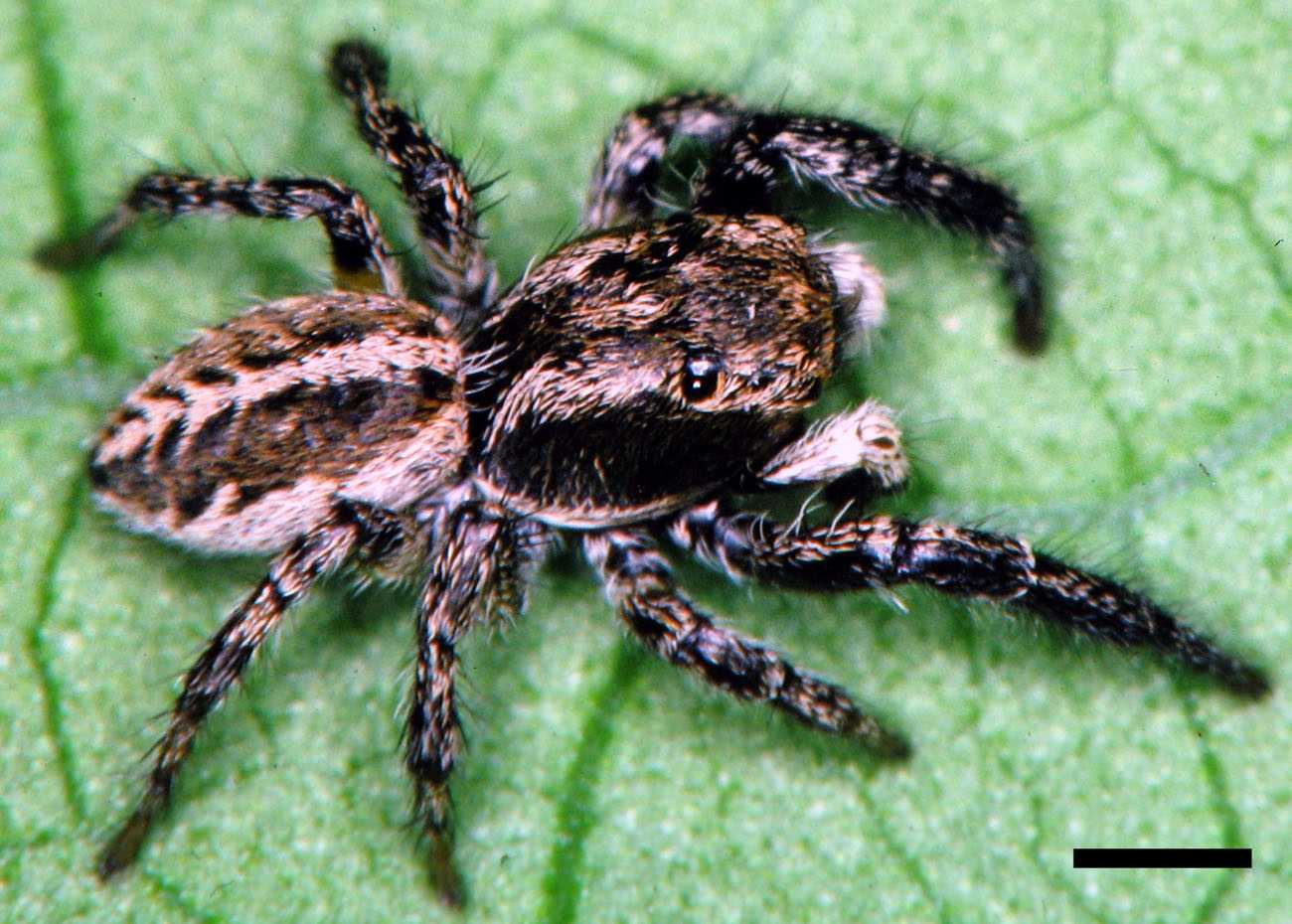
- Male Pellenattus peninsularis

Scientific classification
- Kingdom: Animalia
- Phylum: Arthropoda
- Subphylum: Chelicerata
- Class: Arachnida
- Order: Araneae
- Infraorder: Araneomorphae
- Family: Salticidae
- Subfamily: Salticinae
- Genus: Pellenattus; Maddison, 2017

Type species
- P. peninsularis (Emerton, 1925)

= Pellenattus =

Genus of spiders

Pellenattus is a genus of North American jumping spiders that was first described by Wayne Maddison in 2017. It was originally described as a subgenus of Pellenes, but was elevated to its own genus in 2024. It is closely related to the genera Hivanua and Habronattus.

As of December 2025, this genus includes 12 species:

- Pellenattus apacheus (Lowrie & Gertsch, 1955) – United States
- Pellenattus canadensis (Maddison, 2017) – Canada, United States
- Pellenattus cinctipes (Banks, 1898) – Mexico
- Pellenattus corticolens (Chamberlin, 1924) – Mexico
- Pellenattus crandalli (Lowrie & Gertsch, 1955) – United States
- Pellenattus grammaticus (Chamberlin, 1925) – United States
- Pellenattus levii (Lowrie & Gertsch, 1955) – United States
- Pellenattus limatus (G. W. Peckham & E. G. Peckham, 1901) – United States
- Pellenattus longimanus (Emerton, 1913) – United States
- Pellenattus peninsularis (Emerton, 1925) – Canada, United States
- Pellenattus shoshonensis (Gertsch, 1934) – United States
- Pellenattus washonus (Lowrie & Gertsch, 1955) – United States
