= Taha Uku =

Small water bay body

Taha Uku is a small bay within Ta‘a ‘Oa (the Bay of Traitors) on the south coast of Hiva ‘Oa. A breakwater at the entrance creates a protected harbor which is an entry port.

Taha Uku lies just to the east of Atuona, the administrative center of the southern Marquesas. It is separated from Atuona Bay by a headland called Feki.

== See also ==
- French Polynesia
- Marquesas Islands
