= Tahuata =

Island in French Polynesia

- Commune
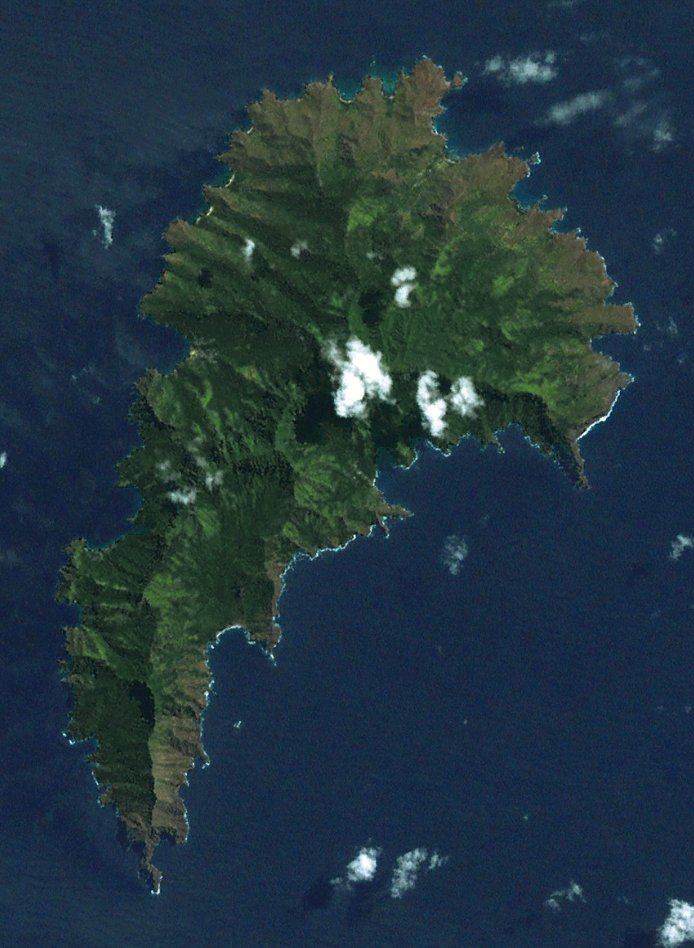
- A satellite image of Tahuata

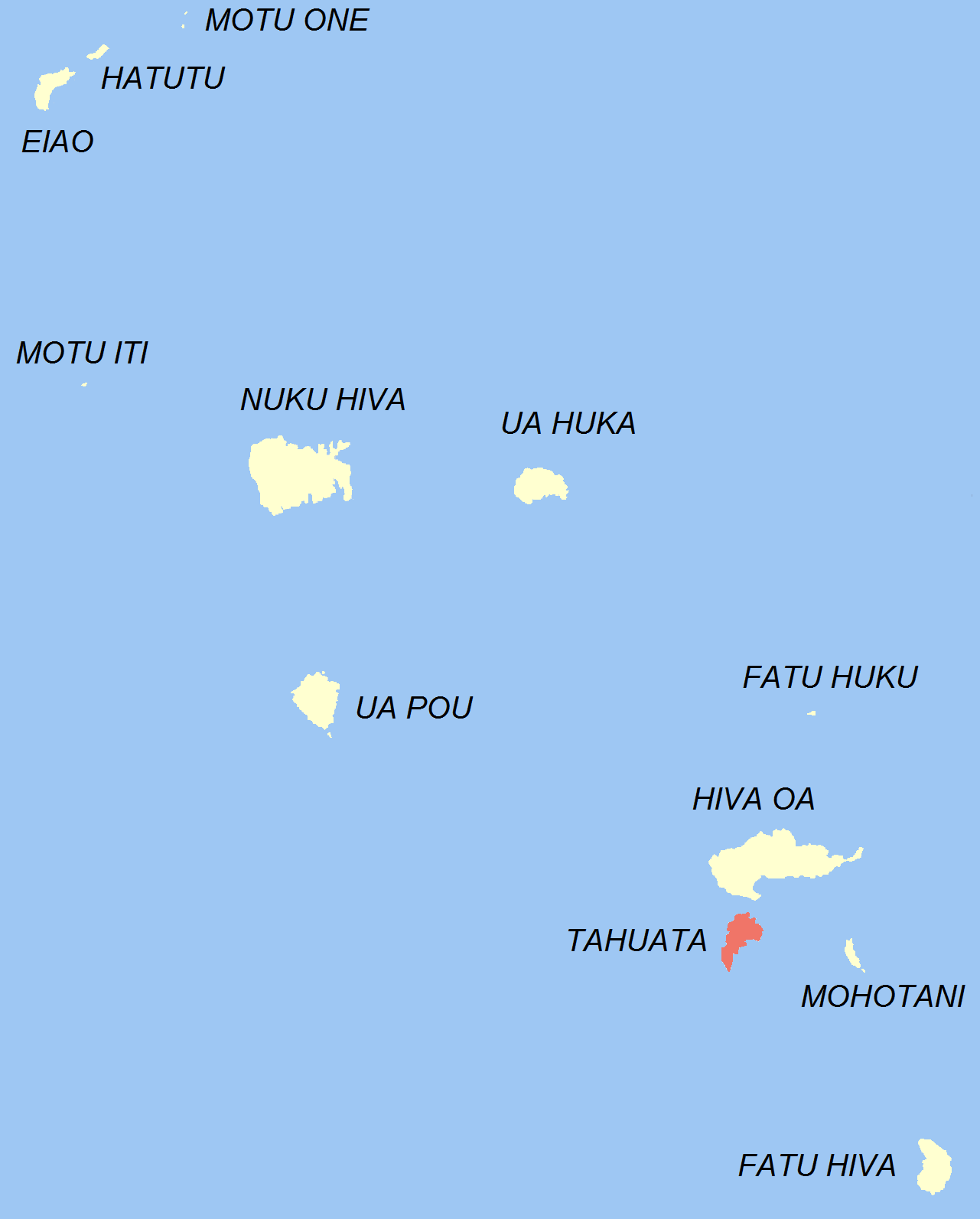
- Location of the commune (in red) within the Marquesas Islands
- Location of Tahuata
- Coordinates: 9°56′00″S 139°05′00″W
- Country: France
- Overseas collectivity: French Polynesia
- Subdivision: Marquesas Islands

Government
  - Mayor (2020–2026): Félix Barsinas
- Area^{1}: 61 km^{2} (24 sq mi)
- Highest elevation: 1,050 m (3,440 ft)
- Lowest elevation: 0 m (0 ft)
- Population (2022): 595
  - Density: 9.8/km^{2} (25/sq mi)
- Time zone: UTC−09:30
- INSEE/Postal code: 98746 /98743
- ^{1} French Land Register data, which excludes lakes, ponds, glaciers > 1 km^{2} (0.386 sq mi or 247 acres) and river estuaries.

Tahuata is the smallest of the inhabited Marquesas Islands, in French Polynesia, an overseas territory of France in the Pacific Ocean. It is located 4 km (2.5 mi.) to the south of the western end of Hiva Oa, across the Canal du Bordelais, called Ha‘ava in Marquesan.

== History ==
Archaeological evidence indicates that Tahuata was inhabited by Polynesians as early as AD 200.

In later pre-European times, the tribes of Tahuata were allied with the tribes from the Nuku province of Hiva Oa, and the island was considered a dependency of that province.

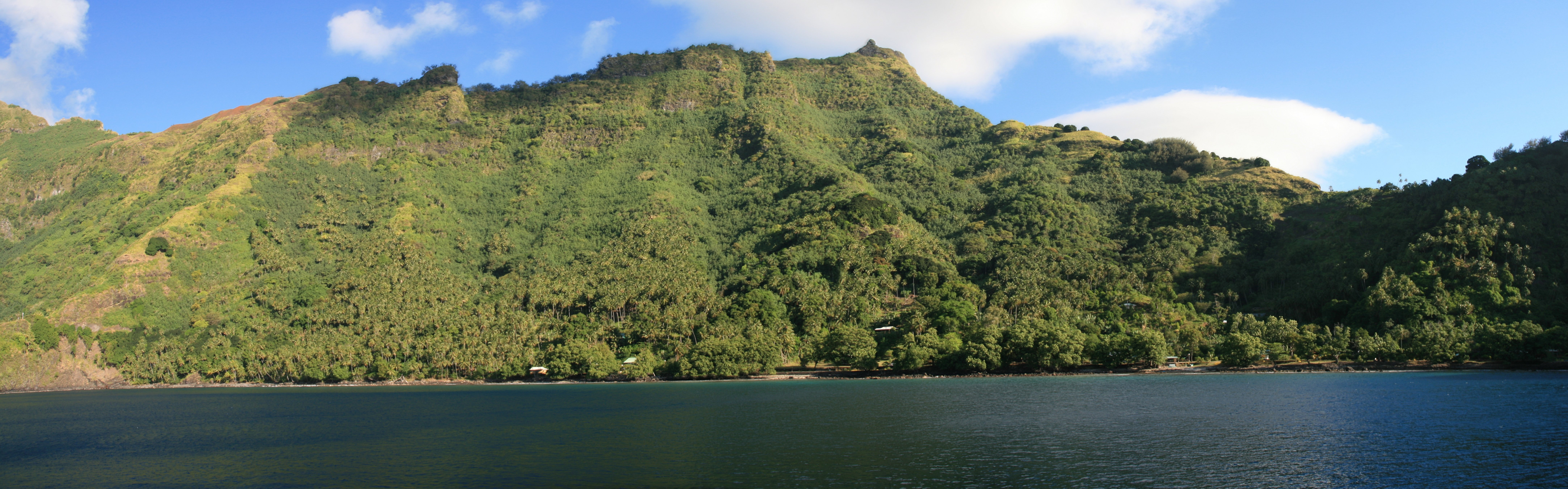
West coast of Tahuata Island, from Hapatoni bay.

The first recorded sighting by Europeans was by the Spanish expedition of Álvaro de Mandaña on 22 July 1595. They charted the island as Santa Cristina. They landed at Vaitahu that they named Madre de Dios (God's Mother in Spanish). According to the Spanish accounts Tahuata had fowls, fish, sugar cane, plantains, nuts and fruits. The existent town was built on two sides of a rectangular space, the houses being of timber and intertwined canes. A building which the Spaniards supposed to be a religious one stood outside the town, in a space enclosed by palisades, and containing some ill-carved images before which were offerings and provisions. The people had large and well constructed sailing canoes. Their tools were made of shells and fish bones. They used slings, stones, and lances as weapons.

Tahuata was visited by Captain James Cook in 1774 who noted in his log book that the name of the island called Santa Christina by Mendaña was known as Ohitahoo.

According to Cook (1797), four tribes shared the island. The Hema occupied the bays of Vaitahu and Iva Iva, the Ahutini lived in Hapatoni, Hanateio and Hanatetena, the Uavi were in the valley bottoms or on the heights, and the Tupohe in the valley of Motopu. But these were exterminated by an alliance of the Hema and Ahutini.

In 1842 the Admiral returned to the Marquesas, commissioned by the government of King Louis Philippe to find a base in the Pacific for French traders and whalers. At that time, the island of Tahuata was united under the flag of a single chief, Iotete. Iotete asked Dupetit-Thouars to leave him a few men, horses and cannons, as he was concerned about American designs on his island.

Dupetit-Thouars took advantage of the situation to make him sign a declaration on May 1, 1842 in which Iotete recognized the sovereignty of France over the entire southeastern group of the Marquesas. Tahuata thus became French. A few months later, Iotete realized that he had been dispossessed of his authority. In September, he went to the mountains in the interior of the island. On September 18, 1842, guerrilla warfare broke out; 24 French sailors and their two officers (Lieutenant Commander Michel Edouard Halley and Lieutenant Philippe Alexandre Laffon de Ladebat) were killed that day. Faced with heavy artillery from two warships (Le Bucéphale and La Boussole) and Marquesan reinforcements from the neighboring island of Taiohae, the Marquesans withdrew to the mountains and peace was signed on September 23.

Gradually, French interest in the Marquesas and Tahuata waned, being replaced by that of Tahiti and the Society Islands. The garrison at Vaitahu was gradually depleted over the years and was abandoned in 1847. In 1849, it was the turn of the missionaries to follow the same path. From then on, the only contact with westerners was with whalers, sandalwood ships and passing commercial vessels, which brought with them alcohol, opium, firearms, prostitution and infectious diseases, which decimated the population, as in the rest of the archipelago. The ancient culture disappeared, leaving the island in disarray for more than thirty years.

However, the law of June 8, 1850 makes Vaitahau, one of the present-day villages of Tahuata, the intended place of deportation in a fortified enclosure (art. 4). Nuka-Hiva Island was used for a simple deportation.

In 1880, French Rear Admiral Bergasse Dupetit-Thouars restored order in the southeastern Marquesas and placed gendarmes on Vaitahu. The French presence remains in Tahuata to this day.

== Geography ==
The land area of Tahuata is 61.0 km^{2} (23.6 sq mi). The highest point on the island is Mount Amatea (French: Mont Amatea), rising to an elevation of 1,050 m (3,445 ft.). The island is very mountainous, with deep valleys and cliffs. The orography does not allow the construction of an airstrip and communications are by sea from the neighboring island of Hiva Oa, separated by the Bordelais channel 3 km wide and currents of 2 knots.

Tahuata is located just south of Hiva Oa, the main island of the southern group of the Marquesas, from which it is separated only by the Canal du Bordelais (Ha'ava in Marquesan), a channel only three kilometers wide, but with a strong sea current of up to two knots.

The island is crescent-shaped, 15 km long, oriented and tapering to the southeast. It has a central ridge that runs along its entire length, steep slopes cut by deep valleys, high cliffs that end in rocky outcrops as buttresses. All this forms a very rugged coastline.

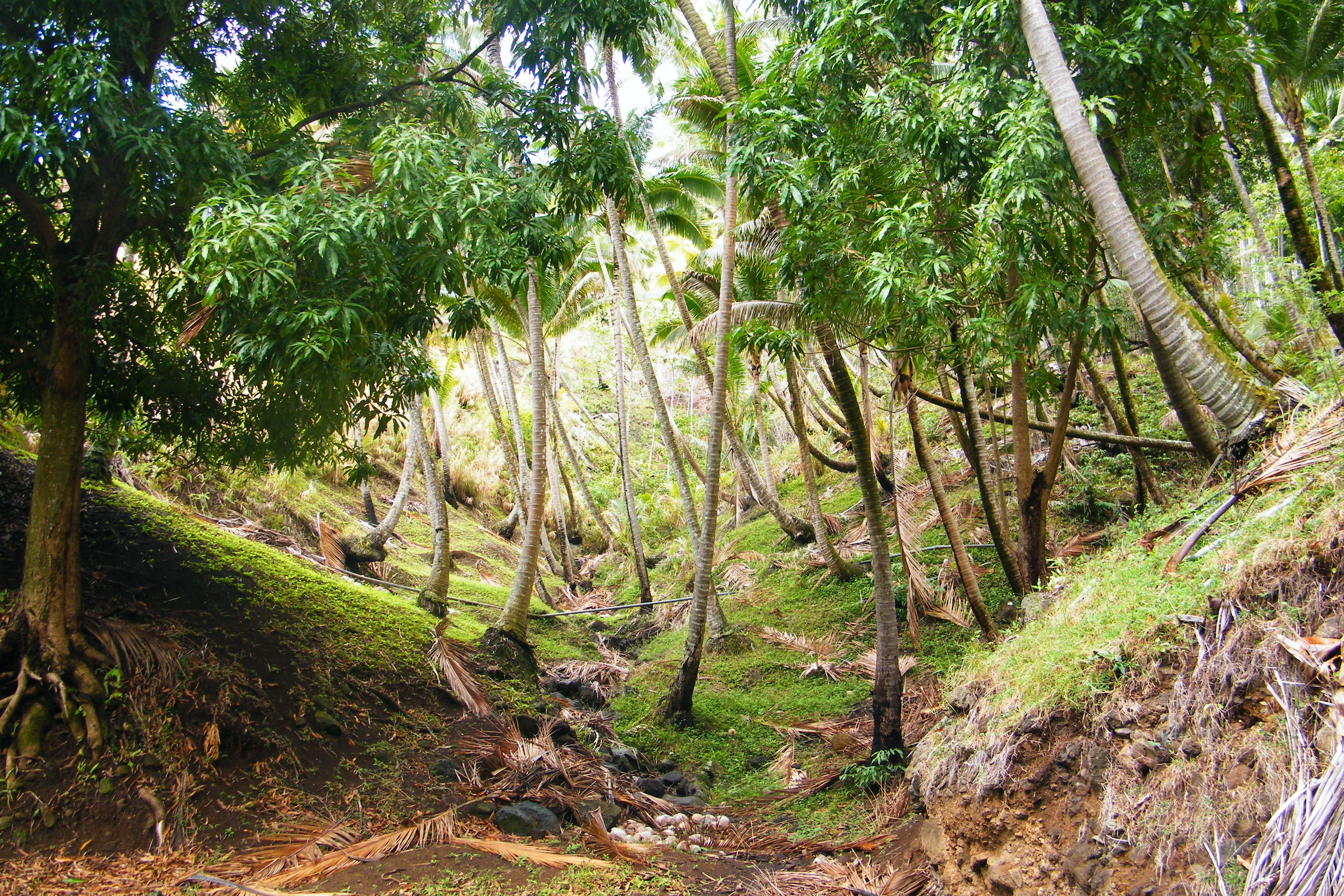
Coconut forest in Tahuata

It also includes small bays with white sandy beaches bathed in clear waters. In fact, Tahuata is the Marquesan island with the most coral formations, in an archipelago that is almost completely devoid of them.

=== Geology ===
Tahuata is a high volcanic island. It is crossed by a mountain range that culminates at 1050 meters, on Mount Tumu Mea Ufa, and at 1000 meters on Mount Pahio. This mountain range, which runs in an arc from east to south, is what remains of the main caldera of the volcano that created the island. It is about nine kilometers in diameter. Within this caldera is another, lower mountainous rim, revealing the site of a second, more than half-submerged crater, which must have been about four kilometers in diameter. It is not yet clear whether this is the caldera of a second, later volcano or a second collapse of the primitive volcano.

The age of Tahuata is dated between 2.90 and 1.75 million years. Its formation is therefore contemporary with that of neighboring Hiva Oa. The two islands may have been part of the same volcanic complex.

== Administration ==
Administratively, Tahuata forms the commune (municipality) of Tahuata, part of the administrative subdivision of the Marquesas Islands. This commune consists solely of the island of Tahuata itself.

The administrative centre of the commune is the settlement of Vaitahu, on the western side of the island.

== Demographics ==
Historical population
Year	Pop.	±%
2002	671	—
2007	671	+0.0%
2012	703	+4.8%
2017	653	−7.1%
2022	595	−8.9%

Australian anthropologist Nicholas Thomas estimates that the population of this island was at least 7,000 (and at most 15,000) in 1800, 4,000 in 1830 and 2,000 in 1840. The catastrophic depopulation is believed to be due to changes that have occurred over half a century: intertribal rivalries, commodification of crafts, unequal trade, dwindling local food supplies, and sexually transmitted diseases.

The inhabitants are now spread over four villages, two in the west, Vaitahu and Hapatoni, and two in the east, Motopu and Hanateio, each in a different valley.

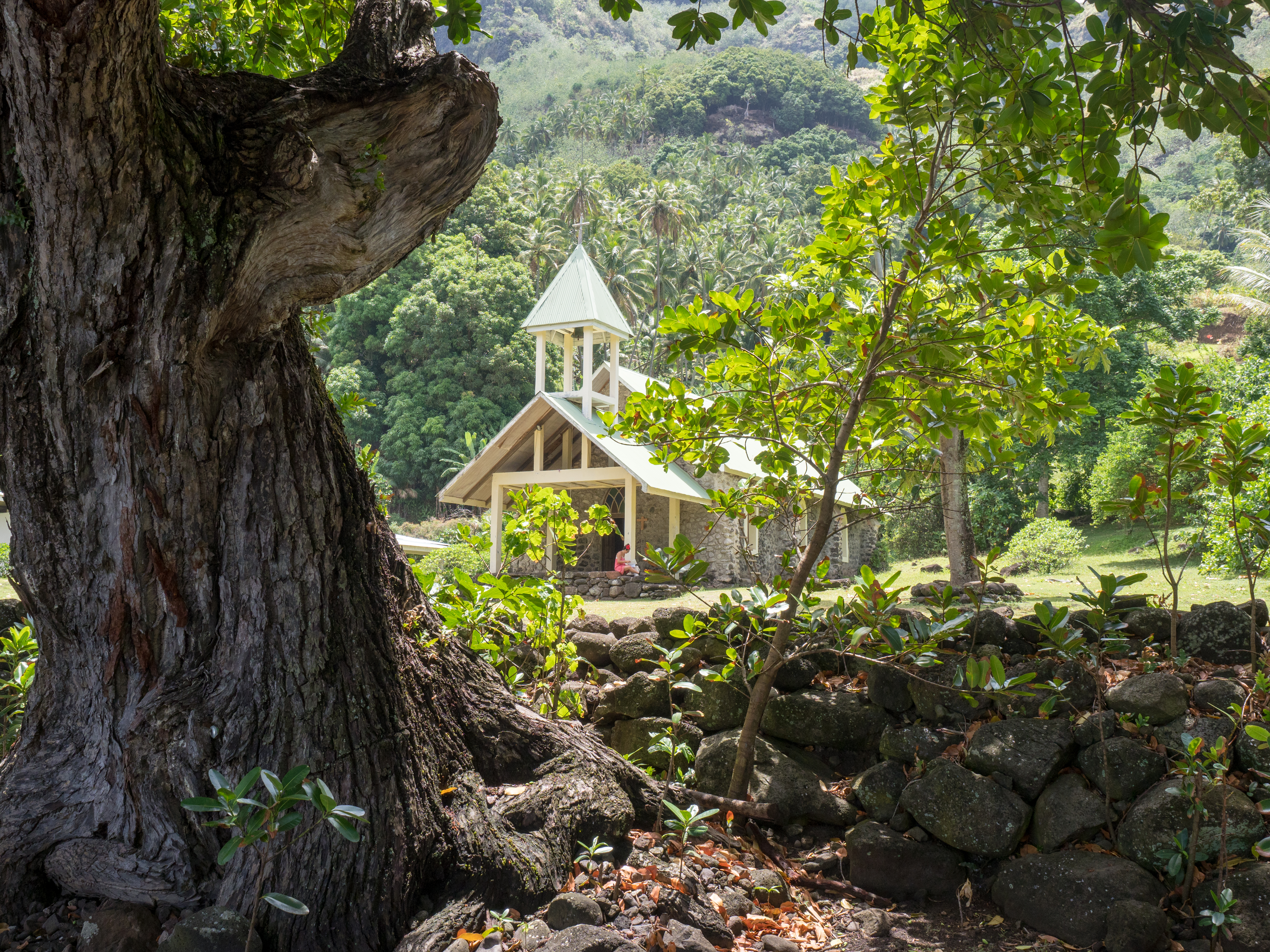
Immaculate Heart of Mary Church in Hapatoni

The island's population is decreasing. In 2022, the island had 595 inhabitants.

The inhabitants speak the southern Marquesan language and French (the only official language).

=== Religion ===
Most of the island's current population is affiliated with Christianity which was brought to the region by missionaries from both Catholic and Protestant groups. The Catholic Church administers 4 religious buildings under the jurisdiction of the Diocese of Taiohae (Dioecesis Taiohaënus seu Humanae Telluris; Diocèse de Taiohae ou Tefenuaenata), the Church of Saint Joseph in Hanatetena (Église de Saint-Joseph), the Church of the Sacred Heart of Mary in Hapatoni (Église du Saint-Cœur-de-Marie), the Church of Our Lady of the Seven Sorrows in Motopu (Église de Notre-Dame-des-Sept-Douleurs), and the Church of the Holy Mother of God (Église de la Sainte-Mère-de-Dieu).

== Economy ==
Tahuata's economy remains primarily primary. The fertile valleys allow the cultivation of cassava and bananas, as well as copra and noni. Until the 1980s, coffee was also grown. Fishing is also important, especially lobster fishing.

Handicrafts provide additional income. Almost all men carve rosewood and bone, either horse or fish, and swordfish rostrum. The carvings are based on traditional Marquesan and Polynesian motifs. There is a handicraft center in Vaitahu, next to the town hall. Artisans sell their products to tourists and passing traders, who then sell them in Tahiti.

Overshadowed by its larger neighbor, Tahuata is less frequented by tourists. However, it has many assets, both natural and cultural. On the east coast there are beautiful white sand beaches, due to the coral formations present on the edge of the island. On Vaitahu you can see the modern church, a mixture of European and Marquis styles; the archaeological museum; the harbor where the first Western explorer set foot; the remains of the French fort built in 1850; the marine cemetery; and the archaeological sites. In Hapatoni, the royal alley, the church and the marae. In the Hanateio valley there are archaeological sites with well-preserved petroglyphs.

In March 2006, Tahuata hosted the first mini-artistic festival of the Marquesas Islands.

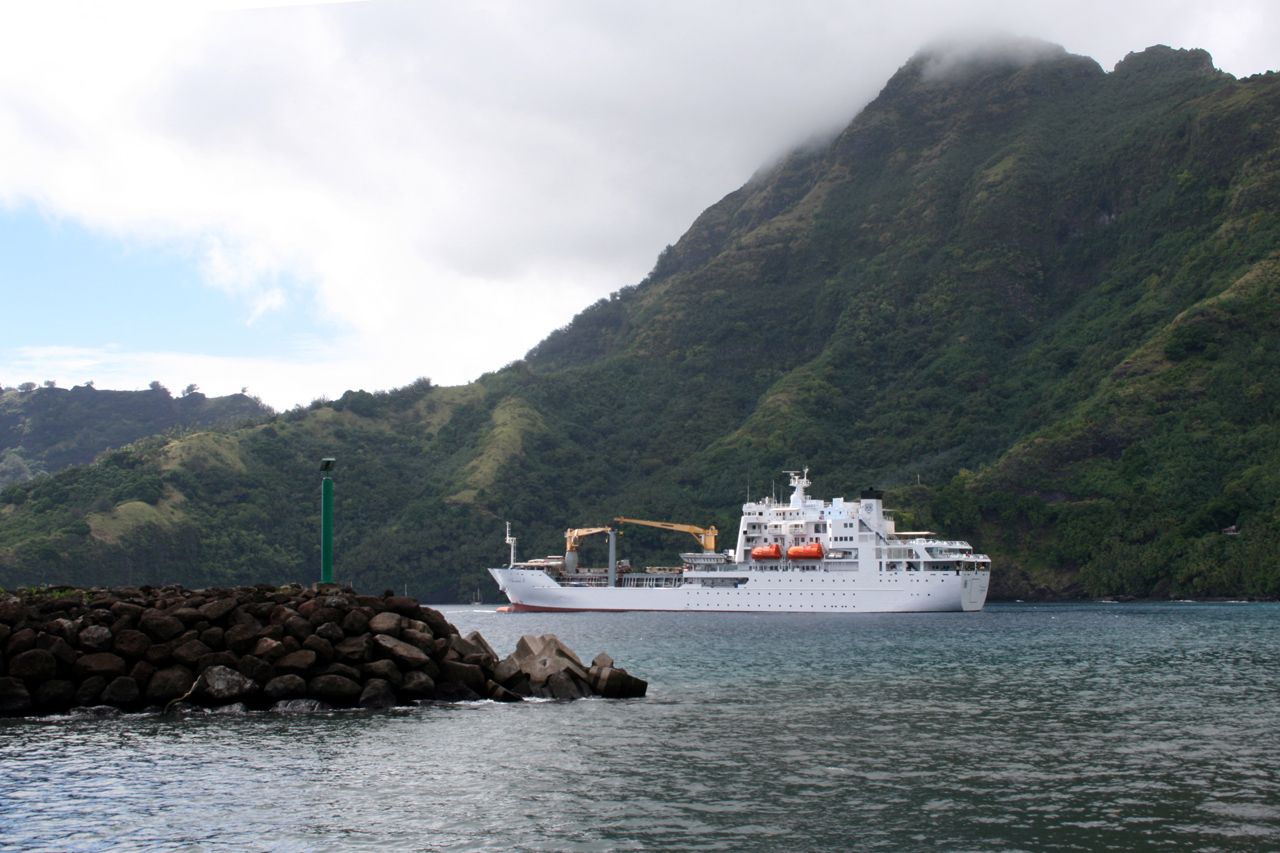
The Aranui anchored at the island

== Infrastructure ==
Vaitahu is home to the town hall, as well as a post office and an infirmary. There are no banks; credit cards are not used on the island. There are kindergartens and primary schools in the various villages on the island.

There is no airport; it is necessary to use the Hiva Oa airport and then take other means of transportation: the communal catamaran Tahuata Nui (fifty minutes crossing), the helicopter (ten minutes), speedboats. Cargo ships regularly serve the island: the Aranui every three weeks, the Taporo once or twice a month. The rugged terrain prevents the creation of an accessible dock for large ships. Passengers and goods must use a whaleboat to disembark.

== See also ==
- French Polynesia
- Dependent Territory
