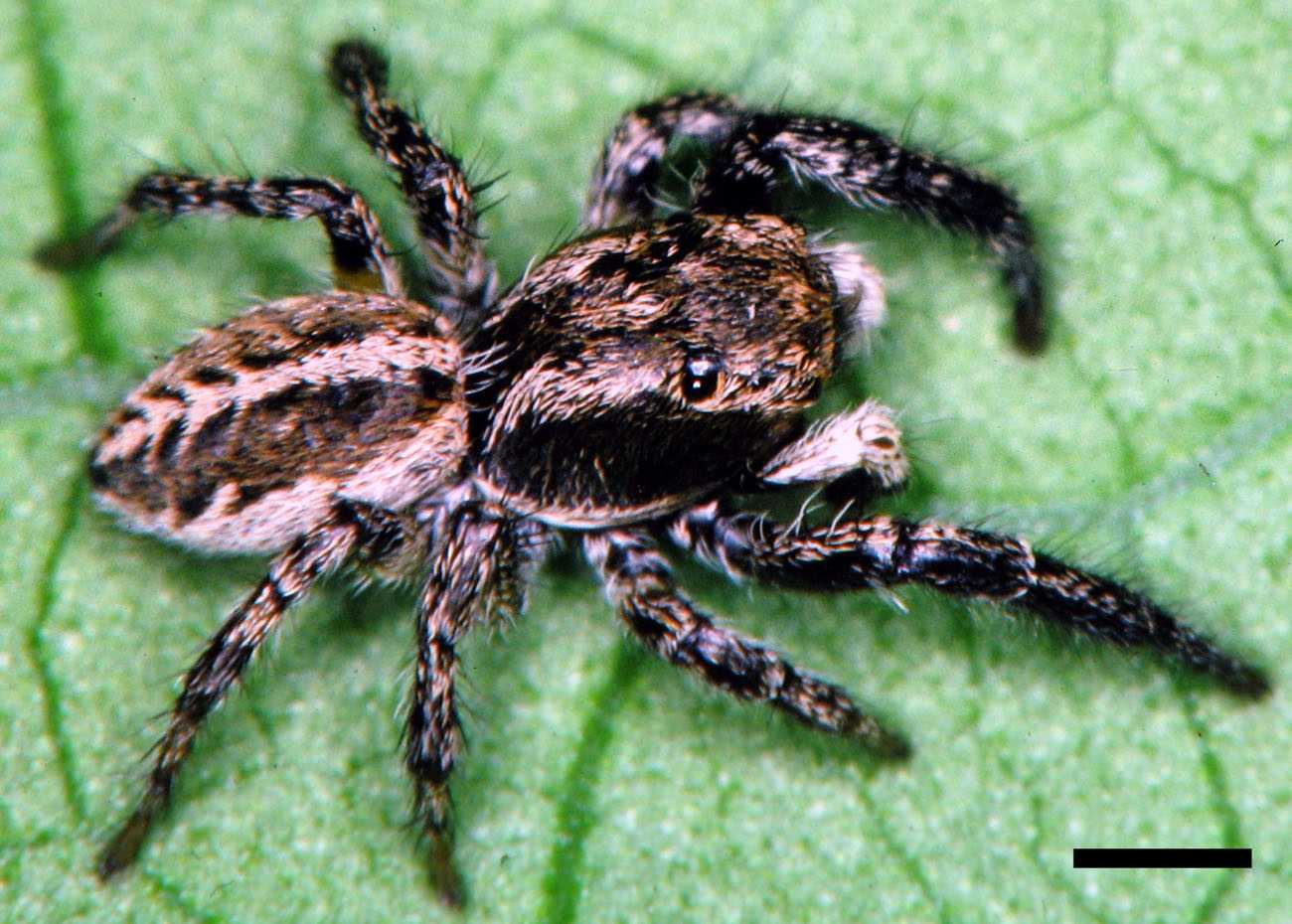
- Male Pellenattus peninsularis from Minnesota

Scientific classification
- Kingdom: Animalia
- Phylum: Arthropoda
- Subphylum: Chelicerata
- Class: Arachnida
- Order: Araneae
- Infraorder: Araneomorphae
- Family: Salticidae
- Genus: Pellenattus
- Species: P. peninsularis

Binomial name
- Pellenattus peninsularis (Emerton, 1925)

Synonyms
- Pellenes peninsularis Emerton, 1925; Pellenes wrighti Lowrie & Gertsch, 1955

= Pellenattus peninsularis =

Species of spider

Pellenattus peninsularis is a jumping spider species in the genus Pellenattus.

== Description ==
The spider is small and dark, although some from the west are light brown, rust or tan coloured. The female has light paps and light chevrons on its abdomen, while the male has a line down the centre.

== Synonym ==
Maddison declared that Pellenes wrighti Lowrie & Gertsch, 1955 is a synonym of this species in 2017. A lapsed synonym is Pellenes peninsulanus Roewer, 1954.

== Distribution ==
The species has been found in Canada and the United States of America.
