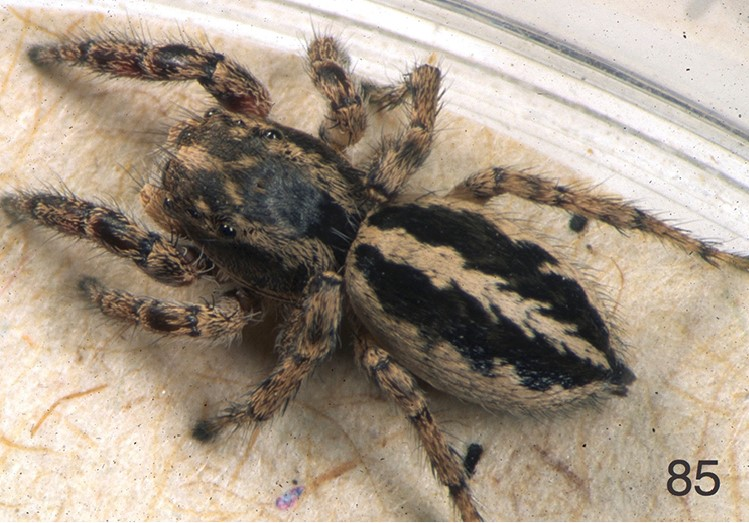

Scientific classification
- Kingdom: Animalia
- Phylum: Arthropoda
- Subphylum: Chelicerata
- Class: Arachnida
- Order: Araneae
- Infraorder: Araneomorphae
- Family: Salticidae
- Genus: Pellenattus
- Species: P. longimanus

Binomial name
- Pellenattus longimanus (Emerton, 1913)

Synonyms
- Pellenes longimanus Emerton, 1913

= Pellenattus longimanus =

Species of spider

Pellenattus longimanus is a species of jumping spider in the family Salticidae. It is found in the United States.
