= Paul Gauguin Cultural Center =

Cultural center in French Polynesia

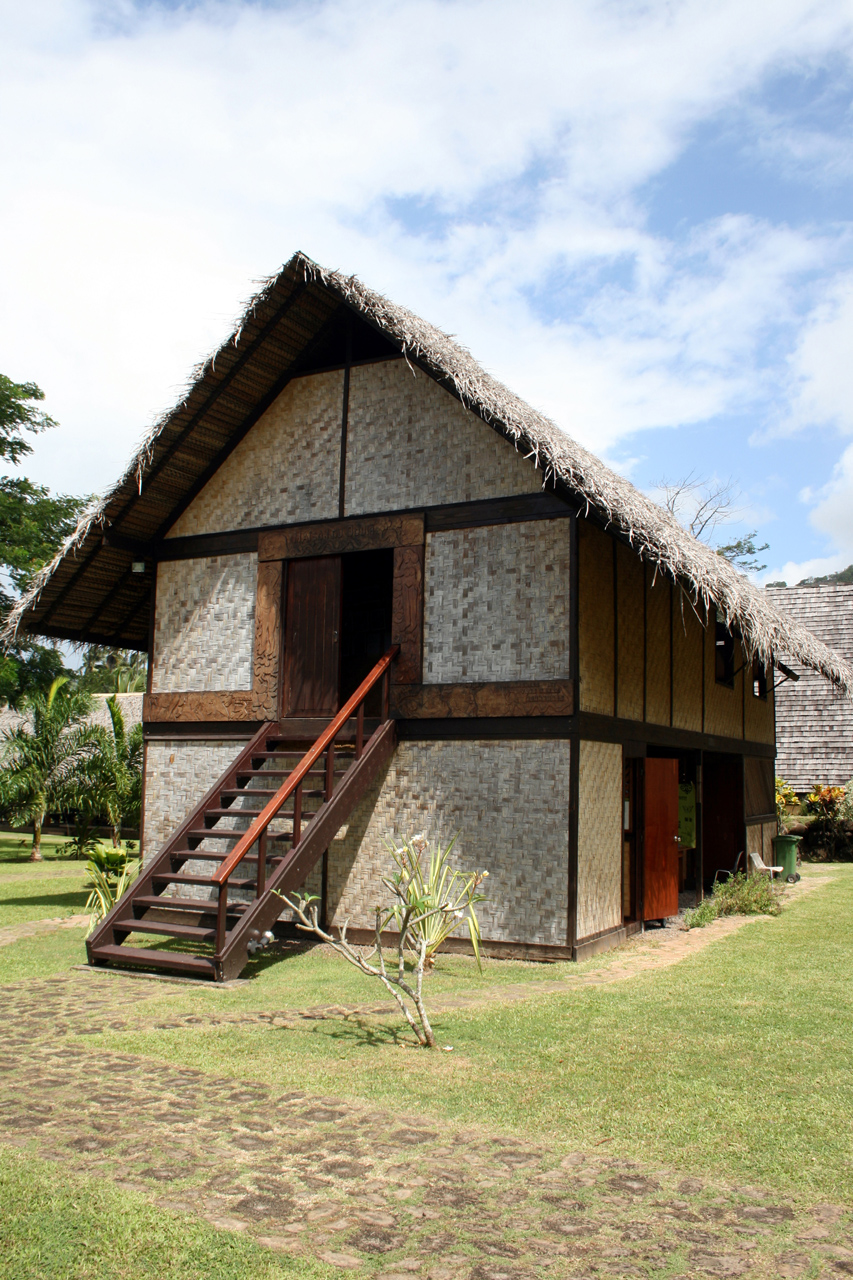
- Reconstruction of Gauguin's home Maison du Jouir (House of Pleasure) at Atuona.
- Established: 2003
- Location: Marquesas Islands (French Polynesia
- Coordinates: 9°48′13.52″S 139°2′26.86″W
- Website: Gauguin Cultural Center — (in French)

The Paul Gauguin Cultural Center (French: Le Centre Culturel Paul Gauguin) was finished in 2003, to coincide with the 100th anniversary of the death of Paul Gauguin, in Atuona, on Hiva ʻOa, in the Marquesas Islands (French Polynesia).

Atuona was Paul Gauguin's home for the last three years of his life, and he is buried in the cemetery (Calvary Cemetery, French: Cimetière Calvaire) there.

== See also ==
- Paul Gauguin Museum, Tahiti, French Polynesia.
