= Temetiu =

Mountain in Hiva Oa, French Polynesia

Coordinates: 9°47′50″S 139°04′48″W

Highest point
- Elevation: 1,269 m (4,163 ft)
- Prominence: 1,269 m (4,163 ft)
- Listing: Ribu

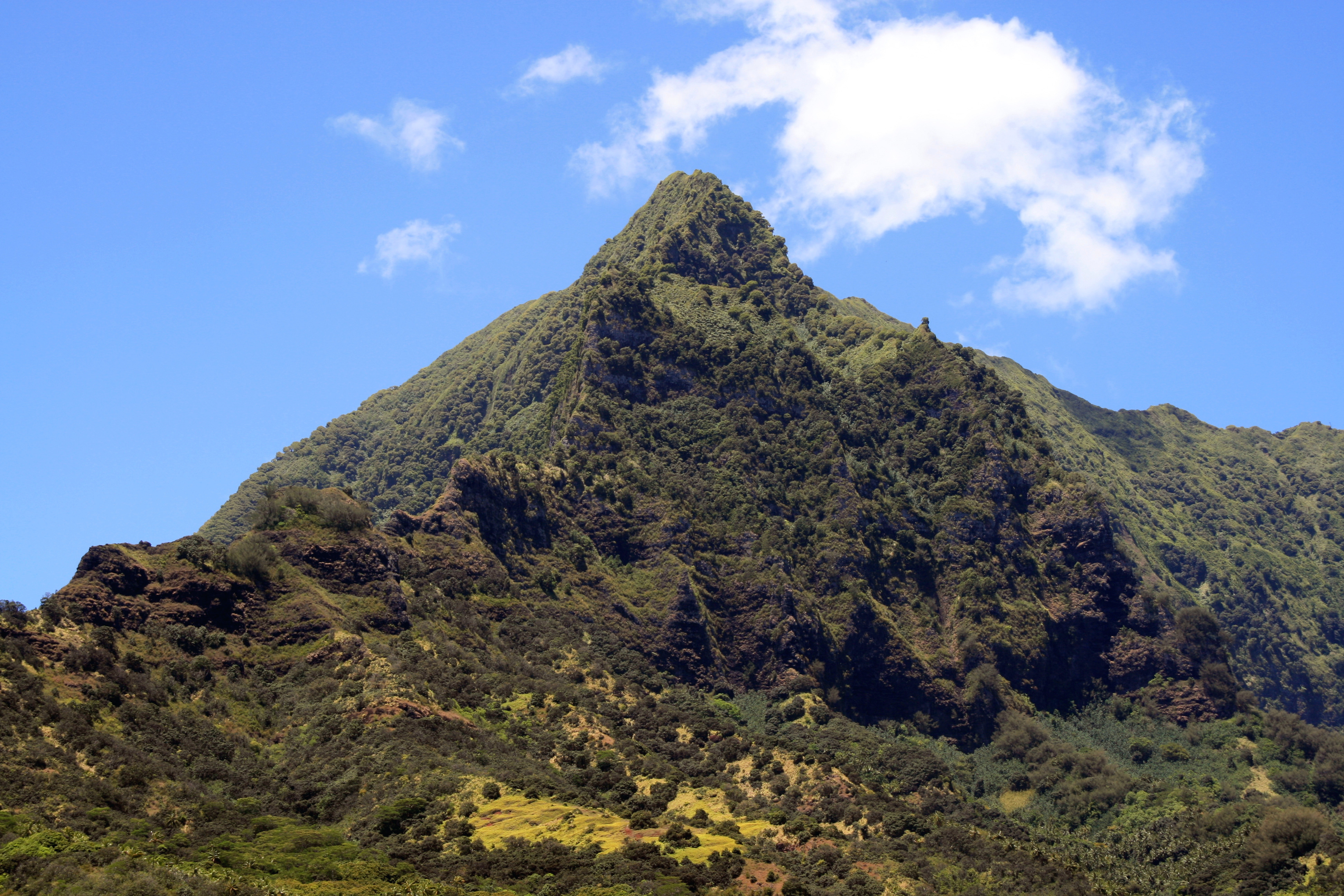
Mount Temetiu, above Atuona, the main village of Hiva-Oa, Marquesas Island, French Polynesia.

Temetiu is the South Marquesan name for the highest peak of the mountain ridge that rises above the western end of Ta'a Oa (the Bay of Traitors) in southwestern Hiva ʻOa.

Rising to 1,269 m (4,163 ft.) above sea level, Temetiu is also the highest point on the island.

== See also ==
- Atuona
- Marquesas Islands
- French Polynesia
