= Hivanua =

Scientific classification
- Kingdom: Animalia
- Phylum: Arthropoda
- Subphylum: Chelicerata
- Class: Arachnida
- Order: Araneae
- Infraorder: Araneomorphae
- Family: Salticidae
- Subfamily: Salticinae
- Genus: Hivanua; Maddison, 2024

Type species
- H. tekao Maddison, 2024

Species
- 6, see text

Genus of spiders

Hivanua is a genus of spiders in the family Salticidae.

== Distribution ==
Hivanua is endemic to the Marquesas Islands of French Polynesia.

== Etymology ==
The genus name references the two largest islands in its range, Hiva Oa and Nuku Hiva.

== Species ==
As of January 2026, this genus includes six species:

- Hivanua flavipes (Berland, 1933) – French Polynesia (Marquesas Islands)
- Hivanua nigrescens (Berland, 1933) – French Polynesia (Marquesas Is.)
- Hivanua nigrolineata (Berland, 1933) – French Polynesia (Marquesas Is.)
- Hivanua rufescens (Berland, 1934) – French Polynesia (Marquesas Is.)
- Hivanua tekao Maddison, 2024 – French Polynesia (Marquesas Is.)
- Hivanua triangulifer (Berland, 1933) – French Polynesia (Marquesas Is.)
