= Paul Gauguin Museum =

- Musée Paul Gauguin
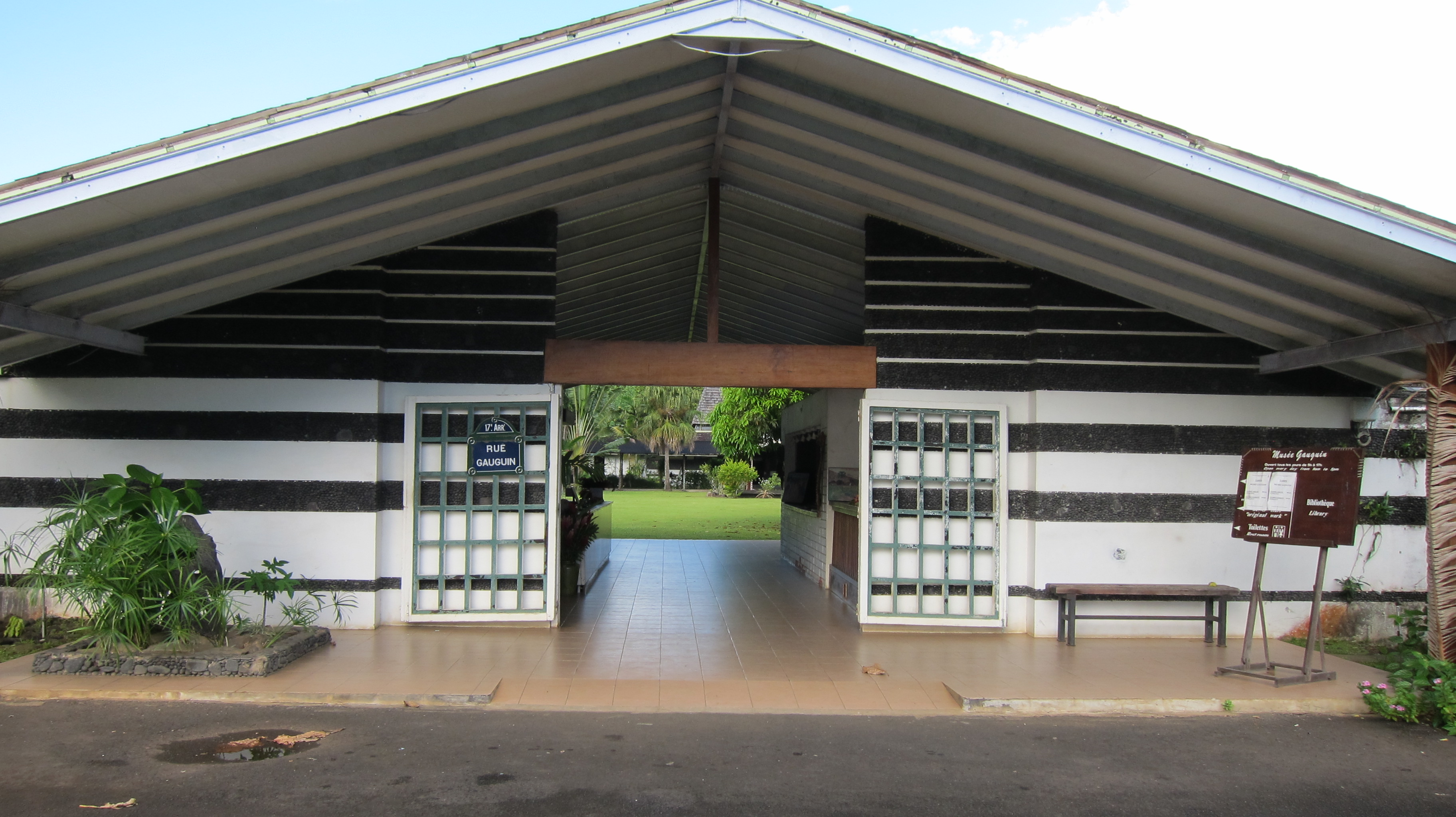
- Paul Gauguin Museum (Tahiti)
- Established: June 15, 1965
- Location: Tahiti, French Polynesia
- Coordinates: 17.7307°S 149.3322°W
- Type: Art museum
- Website: Petites histoires du Musée Gauguin de Tahiti — (in French)

The Paul Gauguin Museum (French: Musée Paul Gauguin) is a Japanese-styled-architecture art museum dedicated to the life and works of Paul Gauguin in Tahiti, French Polynesia. The museum is closed for renovations, but the sister museum in Hiva Oa is open.

The museum is located at PK 51, 2 Papeari, Tahiti, directly across from the Botanical Gardens. French Polynesian and Marquesan cultural aspects are represented in its exhibits, which include original Paul Gauguin documents, photographs, reproductions, sculptures, engravings and gouaches. Also included and unseen in years are some of his sketches and block prints.

The museum was closed in 2013 for renovation. After the renovation and update is completed, the new museum will reappear with series of attractive exhibitions with valuable exhibits to be well displayed, protected and conserved by high-end museum showcases.

== See also ==
- Paul Gauguin Cultural Center
- List of single-artist museums
