= Pepane =

Pepane was the traditional eastern province of the island of Hiva Oa in the Marquesas archipelago, during pre-European times. Together with Nuku, it was a tribal confederacy. Nuku and Pepane were rivals who fought multiple wars. Pepane comprised all of Eastern and Central Hiva Oa, bordering the Tahu Uku valley.
