= Nuku =

Province of the island of Hiva Oa in pre-European times

Coordinates: 9°49′45.42″S 139°4′12.11″W

Nuku was a traditional province of the island of Hiva Oa in pre-European times. It did not function as a unified governmental unit, but rather as a confederation of local tribes during times of war with tribes from Hiva Oa's other province, Pepane. Nuku comprised approximately the western half of Hiva Oa's landmass, as well as the whole of the tribes of the neighboring islands of Tahuata and Fatu Hiva.

== Resources ==
- Handy, E. S. Craighill. The Native Culture in the Marquesas. Bernice Pauahi Bishop Museum Bulletin 9. B.P.B. Museum, Honolulu, 1971.
