= Vaitahu =

Coordinates: 9°56′15″S 139°6′40″W

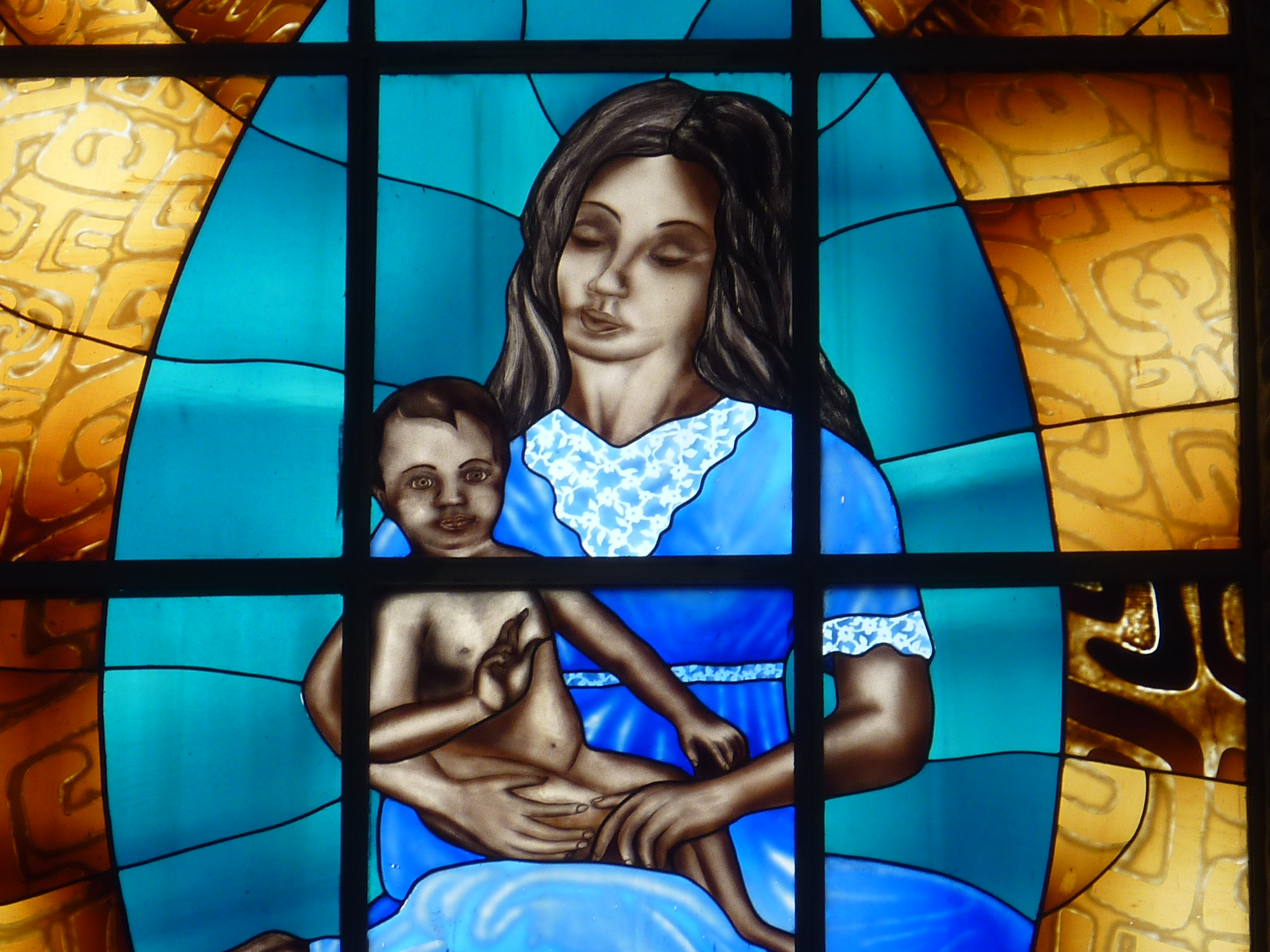
Detail of stained glass, Vaitahu church. Image courtesy of Mark Reed

Vaitahu is the name of a bay and valley in western Tahuata. It is the location of the most important village on the island.

Spanish explorer Álvaro de Mendaña landed here on 21 July 1595 and named the town Madre de Dios (God's Mother in Spanish). In 1774, Captain James Cook landed here (and named it Resolution Bay), and it was here that Admiral Abel Aubert du Petit-Thouars signed the treaty of annexation of the Marquesas to France, in 1842.

The first Christian missionaries in the Marquesas Islands settled there in 1797, first Protestants who arrived on the ship Duff, and later, Roman Catholics. The Catholic church, decorated with magnificent stained glass windows, is the most imposing structure in the small village.

== See also ==
- French Polynesia
- Marquesas Islands
