= Caloptilia deltanthes =

Scientific classification
- Kingdom: Animalia
- Phylum: Arthropoda
- Class: Insecta
- Order: Lepidoptera
- Family: Gracillariidae
- Genus: Caloptilia
- Species: C. deltanthes

Binomial name
- Caloptilia deltanthes (Meyrick, 1935)

Species of moth

Caloptilia deltanthes is a moth of the family Gracillariidae. It is known from the Marquesas Islands.

The larvae feed on Glochidion ramiflorum. They mine the leaves of their host plant.
