= Atuona =

Administrative centre of the commune of Hiva-Oa

- Associated commune of Hiva Oa
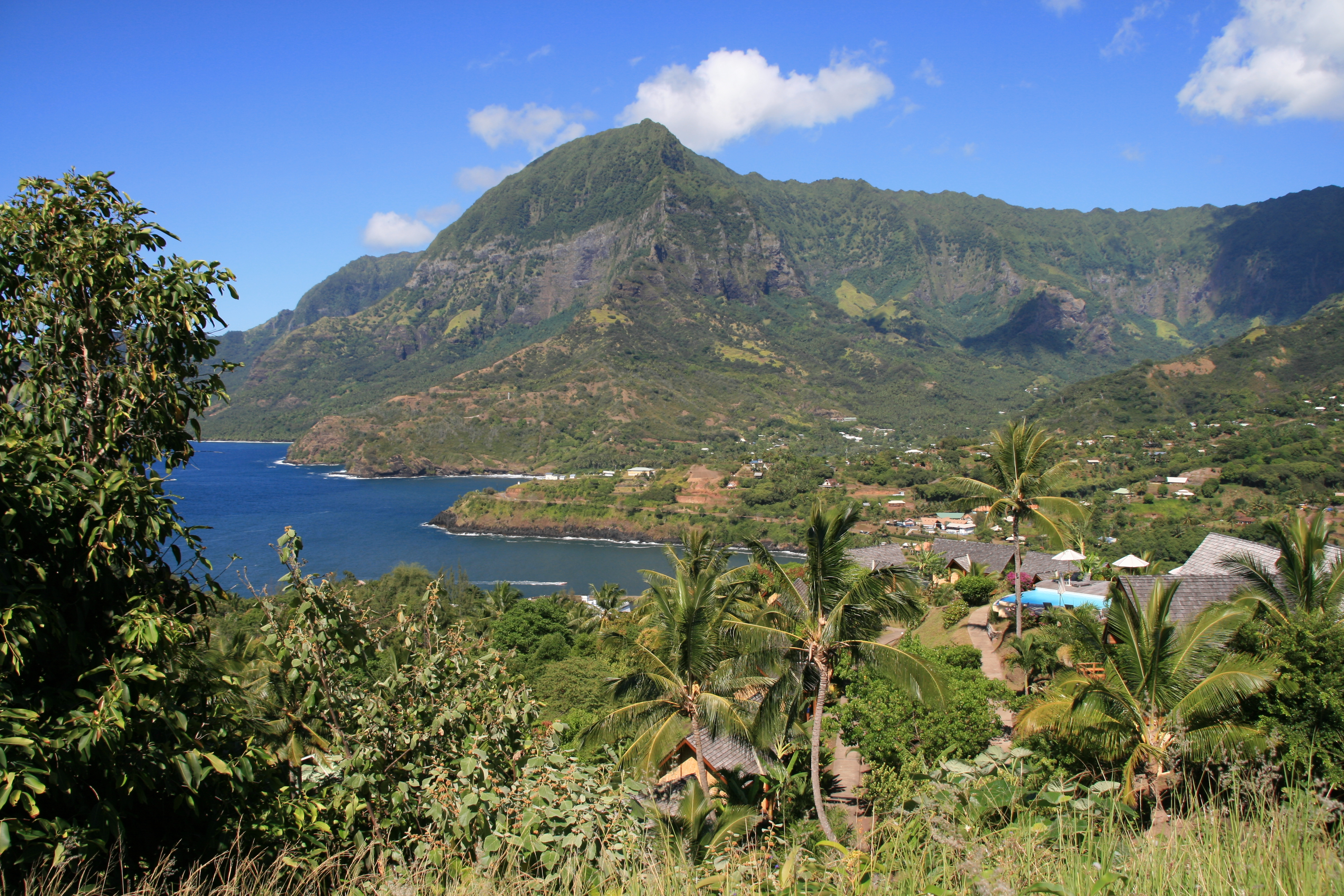
- View of Atuona from Baie Tahauku

- Location within Marquesas Islands
- Location of Atuona
- Location within France
- Coordinates: 9°48′11″S 139°2′23″W
- Country: France
- Overseas collectivity: French Polynesia
- Subdivision: Marquesas Islands
- Commune: Hiva Oa
- Population (2022): 1,993
- Time zone: UTC−9:30

Atuona, located on Atuona Bay on the southern side of Hiva Oa island, French Polynesia, is the administrative centre of the commune (municipality) of Hiva-Oa. Atuona was the capital of all the Marquesas Islands but it has been replaced by Taioha'e (on Nuku Hiva).

The peak Temetiu, rising to 1,213 m (3,980 ft) above sea level, towers above the town.

Atuona was the final home of Paul Gauguin, who died there in 1903 and is buried in Calvary Cemetery, which overlooks the town. The Belgian singer Jacques Brel is also buried there. In 2003, construction on the Paul Gauguin Cultural Center was completed in Atuona.

== Climate ==
Climate data for Atuona (1961–1990)
Month	Jan	Feb	Mar	Apr	May	Jun	Jul	Aug	Sep	Oct	Nov	Dec	Year
Mean daily maximum °C (°F)	30.6 (87.1)	30.9 (87.6)	30.9 (87.6)	30.6 (87.1)	30.0 (86.0)	29.0 (84.2)	28.5 (83.3)	28.5 (83.3)	29.1 (84.4)	29.9 (85.8)	30.6 (87.1)	30.8 (87.4)	30.0 (85.9)
Mean daily minimum °C (°F)	22.8 (73.0)	23.1 (73.6)	23.5 (74.3)	23.5 (74.3)	23.0 (73.4)	22.7 (72.9)	22.2 (72.0)	22.1 (71.8)	22.1 (71.8)	22.2 (72.0)	22.4 (72.3)	22.7 (72.9)	22.7 (72.9)
Average precipitation mm (inches)	128.7 (5.07)	122.2 (4.81)	147.0 (5.79)	131.4 (5.17)	144.1 (5.67)	178.4 (7.02)	136.7 (5.38)	112.6 (4.43)	68.0 (2.68)	85.5 (3.37)	69.9 (2.75)	97.3 (3.83)	1,421.8 (55.97)
Mean monthly sunshine hours	249.7	223.6	226.2	218.8	219.2	193.4	202.0	217.6	223.6	241.4	245.2	244.1	2,704.8
Source: National Oceanic and Atmospheric Administration

== See also ==
- French Polynesia
