= Marquesan language =

Polynesian language spoken in the Marquesas of French Polynesia

Marquesan
- Èo ènana (North Marquesan); Èo ènata (South Marquesan)
- Native to: French Polynesia
- Region: Marquesas Islands, Tahiti
- Native speakers: 8,700 (2007 census)
- Language family: Austronesian: Malayo-Polynesian; Oceanic; Polynesian; Eastern Polynesian; Marquesic; Marquesan

Language codes
- ISO 639-3: Either: mrq – North Marquesan mqm – South Marquesan
- Glottolog: marq1246 Marquesan nort2845 North Marquesan sout2866 South Marquesan

Marquesan is a collection of East-Central Polynesian dialects, of the Marquesic group, spoken in the Marquesas Islands of French Polynesia. They are usually classified into two groups, North Marquesan and South Marquesan, roughly along geographic lines.

== Phonology ==
The most striking feature of the Marquesan languages is their almost universal replacement of the /r/ or /l/ of other Polynesian languages by a /ʔ/ (glottal stop).

Like other Polynesian languages, the phonology of Marquesan languages is characterized by a scarcity of consonants. The consonant phonemes are:

	Labial	Alveolar	Velar	Glottal
Plosive	p	t	k	ʔ
Fricative	f v			h
Nasal	m	n	ŋ	
Liquid		r		

Of this small number of consonants, /ŋ/ is found only in eastern Nuku Hiva (Tai Pi Marquesan), and /f/ is found only in South Marquesan dialects. In writing, the phoneme /ŋ/ is written ⟨n(g)⟩, and /ʔ/ is written ʻ, the ʻokina.

Unlike most Austronesian languages, the /ŋ/ is not an isolated nasal: it is found only in conjunction with a following /k/. So, whereas the Samoan word for 'bay' is faga, pronounced [ˈfa.ŋa], it is hanga in Tai Pi Marquesan, and is pronounced /ˈha.ŋka/. This word is useful to demonstrate one of the more predictable regular consonantal differences between the northern and southern dialects: in North Marquesan, the word is haka, and in South Marquesan, it is hana.

The phoneme /h/ is represented with the letter ⟨h⟩; however, it is realized phonetically as [h], [x], or [s], depending on the following vowel.

The vowel phonemes are the same as in other Polynesian languages, long and short versions of each:

	Front		Central		Back	
	Short	Long	Short	Long	Short	Long
High	i	iː			u	uː
Mid	e	eː			o	oː
Low			a	aː		

In their study of the Ùa Pou dialect of Marquesan, Mutu and Teìkitutoua interpret the long vowels /aː eː iː oː uː/ as sequences of two identical vowels /aa ee ii oo uu/, and list their allophones as [ɑː ɛː iː ɔː uː], while noting that [ɔː] is slightly raised.

/i/ is [ɪ] when following another vowel, [i~ɪ] elsewhere.

/e/ is [e] when preceding a high vowel, [ə] following /a/, and [ɛ] elsewhere.

/a/ is [ʌ], though slightly higher before other vowels, especially /i/ and /u/.

/o/ is [ɔ], which slightly assimilates to the frontness of adjacent vowels.

/u/ is [u].

== Alphabet ==
Marquesan alphabet
A	E	F	H	I	K	M	N	O	P	R	S	T	U	V
a	e	f	h	i	k	m	n	o	p	r	s	t	u	v

The Marquesan Language Academy has adopted an orthography similar to Turo Raapoto's Tahitian orthography, using the grave on the vowels to indicated a preceding glottal stop consonant, the macron to indicate a long vowel and the circumflex to indicate both. Some authors use the apostrophe ⟨’⟩ or the turned apostrophe ⟨ʻ⟩ to write the glottal stop, as is done in several other Polynesian languages.

== Morphosyntax ==
=== Noun and verb phrases ===
Verbal particles are placed before the verb they modify.

Verbal Phrase
Verbal Particles		example	example in a sentence
past	i	i ui (asked)	te mehai i iu (the youth asked)
present	te...nei	te maakau nei (think)	te maakau nei au i tuu kui (I think of my mother)
perfective	u/ua	u hanau (was born)	u hanau au i Hakehatau (I was born at Hakehatau)
imperfective	e	e hee (going)	e hee koe i hea (where are you going?)
inceptive	atahi a	atahi a kai (then they eat)	iu pao taia, atahi a kai (...when finish that, then do they eat)
imperative	a	a hee! (go!)	a hee io te tante (go to the doctor!)

A noun phrase in Marquesan is any phrase beginning with either a case marker or a determiner. Case markers or prepositions always precede the determiners, which in turn precede the number markers. As such, they all precede the noun they modify.

Nominal Phrase Markers
Articles		Demonstratives		Other	
definite singular	te/t-	this	tenei	a certain	titahi
indefinite	e/he	that	tena	other	tahipito
dual/paucal definite	na	that	tea		
anaphoric	hua				

Nominal Number Markers	Number Markers
dual	mou
dual/paucal	mau
plural	tau

There are 11 personal pronouns which are distinguished by singular, dual, and plural. As well as that, there are two other personal pronouns which distinguish possession.

Pronouns
		Singular	Dual/Paucal	Plural	Possession
1st person	exclusive	au/-ʻu	maua	matou	tuʻu
1st person	inclusive	au/-ʻu	taua	tatou	tuʻu
2nd person		koe	koʻua	kotou	to
3rd person		ia	ʻaua	ʻatou	

Complex sentences use verbal nouns in subordinate clauses.

Te hakaiki kei mei Hanaiapa te ono-tina te hakaiki momo mei
DEF chief big from Hanaiapa DEF hear-devb def chief lesser from

Hanaiapa, o Tua-i-kaie, ua noho me te vehine pootu oko

=== Possession ===
Margaret Mutu & Ben Teìkitutoua (2002) present descriptions and examples of possession in Ùa Pou (a north Marquesan dialect). All examples in this section are taken from their work. See notes for more information.

Possession in Marquesan is marked by prepositional particles affixed to the noun phrase which they modify. These prepositional particles relate the phrase as a whole to other parts of the sentence or discourse and therefore can be considered centrifugal particles. Possession is essentially different from the other types of adposition modification in that it marks a relationship between two noun phrases as opposed to that between the verbal phrase and the noun phrase.

There are four possession markers in Marquesan. They are the prepositions: a, o, na and no. Possessive prepositions a and o translate as 'of' while na and no are attributive, possessive prepositions which translate either as 'belong to, of' or 'for'.

==== a and o possessive prepositions ====
In these examples, the relation of two noun phases with the use of the possessive prepositions a and o can be seen. The preposition is affixed to the possessor noun phrase which in turn dominates the possessed phrase.

Úa tihe mai te vahana a tenei tau vehine
PFV arrive hither DEF husband of this PL woman
"The husband of these women has arrived."

Úa tau ma ùka o te haè
PFV land path top of DEF house
"(It) landed on top of the house."

==== na and no attributive, possessive prepositions ====
In these examples, we see the relation of constituents which form a noun phrase. This is an example of attributive, alienable possession.

…ùa ìò i -a Tainaivao è tama na Pekapeka…
PFV taken STATAG PERS Tainaivao INDEF son {of (belong to)} Pekapeka
'(she) was taken by Tainaivao, a son of Pekapeka.'

À too tēnei vaka no koe
IMP take this canoe for 2SG
'Take this canoe for yourself.'

==== Dominant vs subordinate possession ====
Marquesan distinguishes between two contrastive types of possession. The first can be described in very broad terms as possession in which the possessor is dominant, active, superior, or in control of the possessed. A and na mark this type of possession:

E ìò koe he mea vehine na ia
NP take 2SG INDEF thing woman of him
"You will get a wife for him."

On the other hand, o and no indicate possession where the possessor is subordinate, passive, inferior to, or lacking in control over the possessed:

Ù kave mai koe i tēnā kahu no ia
PFV bring hither 2SG DO that dress for her
"You have brought that dress for her (to wear)."

=== Locative phrases ===
Locative constructions in Marquesan follow this pattern (elements in parentheses are optional):

Preposition - (Modifier) - lexical head - (Directional) - (Demonstrative) - (Modifier) - Possessive Attribute/Attributive Noun Phrases

Huʻi-ʻia atu t-o ia keo ʻi tai
turn-PASS DIR ART-POSS 3SG bottom LD sea
"Its bottom is turned seawards."

This locative syntactic pattern is common among Polynesian languages.

== Dialect diversity ==
North Marquesan is spoken in the northern islands (Nuku Hiva, Ua Pou, and Ua Huka), and South Marquesan in the southern islands (Hiva Oa, Tahuata, and Fatu Hiva). In Ua Huka, which was almost entirely depopulated in the 19th century and repopulated with people from both the Northern and Southern Marquesas, the language shares traits of both North Marquesan and South Marquesan. Comparative data on the various dialects of Marquesan can be found in the Linguistic Atlas of French Polynesia (Charpentier & François 2015).

The most noticeable differences between the varieties are Northern Marquesan /k/ in some words where South Marquesan has /n/ or /ʔ/ (glottal stop), and /h/ in all words where South Marquesan has /f/.

The table below compares a selection of words in various dialectal varieties of Marquesan, according to the Linguistic Atlas of French Polynesia, with their pronunciation in the IPA. Tahitian and Hawaiian are also added for comparison.

	North Marquesan			South Marquesan		Hawaiian	Tahitian
	Nuku Hiva	Ua Pou	Ua Huka	Hiva Oa	Fatu Hiva	Hawaii	Tahiti
hello	/kaːʔoha/	/kaːʔoha/	/kaːʔoha/	/kaːʔoha/	/kaːʔoha/	/aloha/	/ʔia ora na/ (/arofa/ 'love, compassion')
human being	/ʔenana/	/ʔenana/	/ʔenana/	/ʔenata/	/ʔenata/	/kanaka/	/taʔata/
life	/pohuʔe/	/pohuʔe/	/pohuʔe/	/pohoʔe/	/pohoʔe/	/ola/	/ora/
body	/nino/	/nino/	/tino/	/tino/	/tino/	/kino/	/tino/
mouth	/haha/	/haha/	/haha/	/fafa/	/fafa/	/waha/	/vaha/
head	/upoko/	/upoko/	/upoko/	/upoʔo/	/upoʔo/	/poʔo/	/upoʔo/
to see	/ʔite/	/kite/	/ʔite/	/ʔite/	/ʔite/	/ʔike/	/ʔite/
to speak	/tekao/	/tekao/	/tekao/	/teʔao/	/teʔao/	/ʔoːlelo/ (/kaʔao/ 'to tell tales')	/parau/
dog	/peto/	/peto/	/peto/	/nuhe/	/nuhe/	/ʔiːlio/	/ʔuːri/
louse	/kutu/	/kutu/	/kutu/	/ʔutu/	/ʔutu/	/ʔuku/	/ʔutu/
yesterday	/tinahi/	/nenahi/	/tinahi/	/tinahi/	/tinahi/	/nehinei/	/inaːnahi/
sky	/ʔaki/	/ʔaki/	/ʔani/	/ʔani/	/ʔani/	/lani/	/raʔi/
moon	/meama/	/meama/	/mahina/	/mahina/	/mahina/	/mahina/	/ʔaːvaʔe/
wind	/metaki/	/metaki/	/metani/	/metani/	/metani/	/makani/	/mataʔi/
sea	/tai/	/tai/	/tai/	/tai/	/tai/	/kai/	/miti/ (/tai/ 'sea, salt')
coral	/puka/	/puka/	/puna/	/feʔeo/	/feʔeo/	/koʔa/ (/puna/ 'plaster, mortar')	/puʔa/
fish	/ika/	/ika/	/ika/	/iʔa/	/iʔa/	/iʔa/	/iʔa/
octopus	/heke/	/heke/	/heke/	/feʔe/	/feʔe/	/heʔe/	/feʔe/
island, land	/henua/	/henua/	/henua/	/fenua/	/fenua/	/honua/	/fenua/
river	/kaʔavai/	/kaʔavai/	/kaʔavai/	/kaʔavai/	/kaʔavai/	/kahawai/	/ʔaːnaːvai/
taro	/taʔo/	/taʔo/	/taʔo/	/taʔo/	/taʔo/	/kalo/	/taro/
coconut	/ʔehi/	/ʔehi/	/ʔehi/	/ʔeʔehi/	/ʔeʔehi/	/niu/	/haʔari/
house	/haʔe/	/haʔe/	/haʔe/	/faʔe/	/faʔe/	/hale/	/fare/
man (male)	/vahana/	/vahana/	/vahana/	/ʔahana/	/ʔahana/	/kaːne/	/taːne/
woman	/vehine/	/vehine/	/vehine/	/vehine/	/vehine/	/wahine/	/vahine/
grandmother	/tupuna kui/ ('grandparent mother')	/tupuna kui/ ('grandparent mother')	/tupuna kui/ ('grandparent mother')	/tupuna vehine/ ('grandparent woman')	/tupuna vehine/ ('grandparent woman')	/kupuna wahine/ ('grandparent woman')	/maːmaː ruːʔau/ ('mom old person')
chief, king	/hakaʔiki/	/hakaʔiki/	/hakaʔiki/	/hakaʔiki/	/hakaʔiki/	/aliʔi/	/ariʔi/
traditional temple precinct, marae	/meʔae/	/meʔae/	/meʔae/	/meʔae/	/paepae/	/heiau/	/marae/
you (singular)	/ʔoe/	/koe/	/ʔoe/	/ʔoe/	/ʔoe/	/ʔoe/	/ʔoe/

The northern dialects fall roughly into four groups:

- Tai Pi, spoken in the eastern third of Nuku Hiva, and according to some linguists, a separate language, Tai Pi Marquesan
- Teiʻi, spoken in western Nuku Hiva
- Eastern Ua Pou
- Western Ua Pou

The southern dialects fall roughly into three groups:

- Pepane: Eastern Hiva ʻOa and Ua Huka
- Fatu Hiva
- Nuku: Western Hiva ʻOa and Tahuata

North Marquesan exhibits some original characteristics. While some Polynesian languages maintained the velar nasal /ŋ/, many have lost the distinction between the nasals /ŋ/ and /n/, merging both into /n/. North Marquesan, like South Island Māori dialects of New Zealand, prefers /k/. Another feature is that, while some Polynesian languages replace *k with /ʔ/, North Marquesan has retained it. (Tahitian and formal Samoan have no /k/ whatsoever, and the /k/ in modern Hawaiian is pronounced either [k] or [t] and derives from Polynesian *t.)

The dialects of Ua Huka are often incorrectly classified as North Marquesan; they are instead transitional. While the island is in the northern Marquesas group, the dialects show more morphological and phonological affinities with South Marquesan. The North Marquesan dialects are sometimes considered two separate languages: North Marquesan and Tai Pi Marquesan, the latter being spoken in the valleys of the eastern third of the island of Nuku Hiva, in the ancient province of Tai Pi. Puka-Pukan, spoken in Puka-Puka and the Disappointment Islands in northeastern Tuamotu, is a dialect of South Marquesan, and should not be confused with the homonymous Pukapukan language spoken in Pukapuka, one of the Cook Islands.

== Phrases (North Marquesan) ==
"Ua he'e oe, tu u haka-iki, ma te vakaf?" - You will go by the canoe, my chief?

"Ka'oha nui te ha'a^te-pe'iu" - Cordial greetings to the chiefess.
