= Hiva Oa =

Island in French Polynesia

Hiva'oa
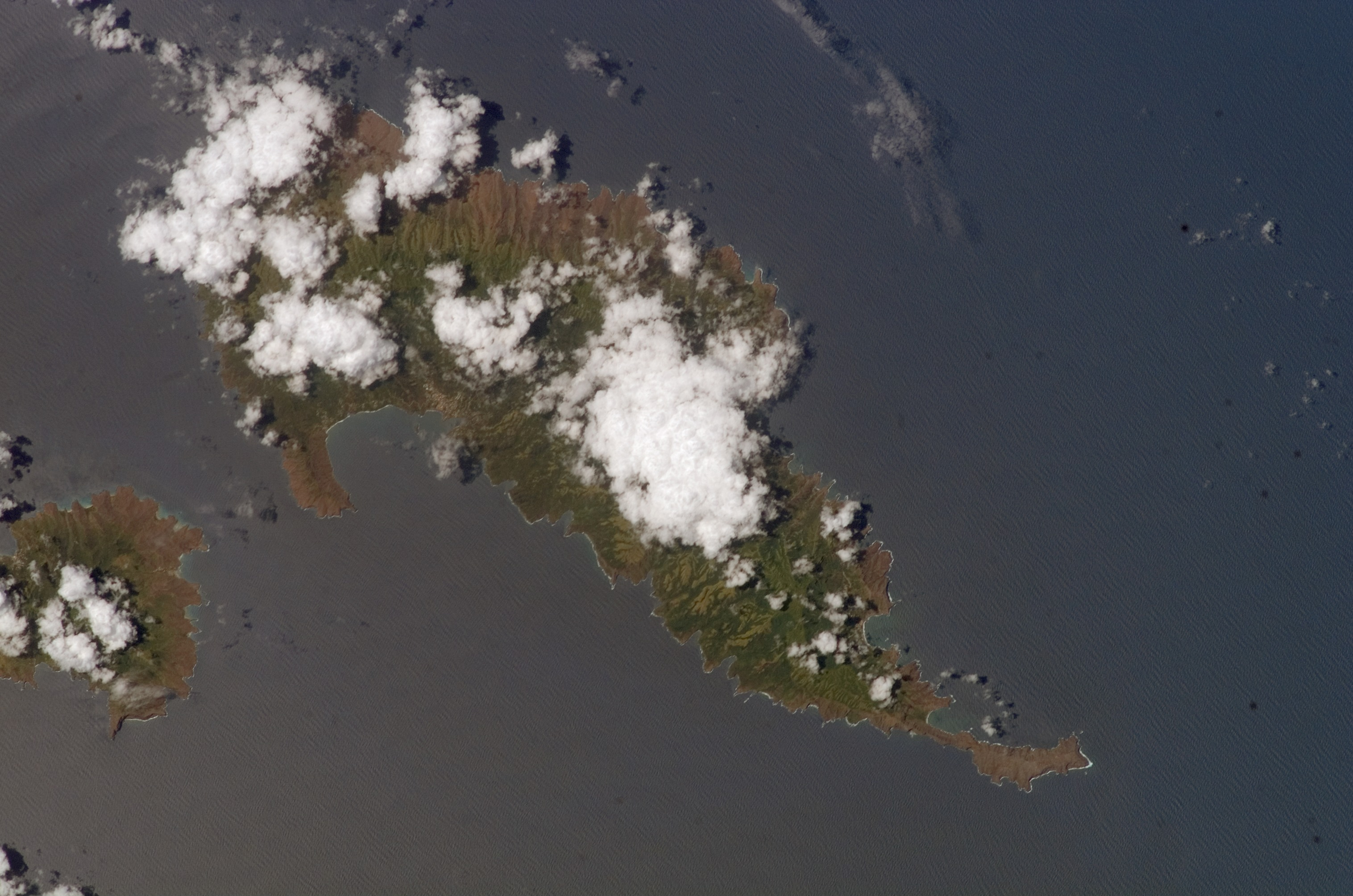
- The island of Hiva Oa. Atuouna is located on the large bay on the south side of the island.

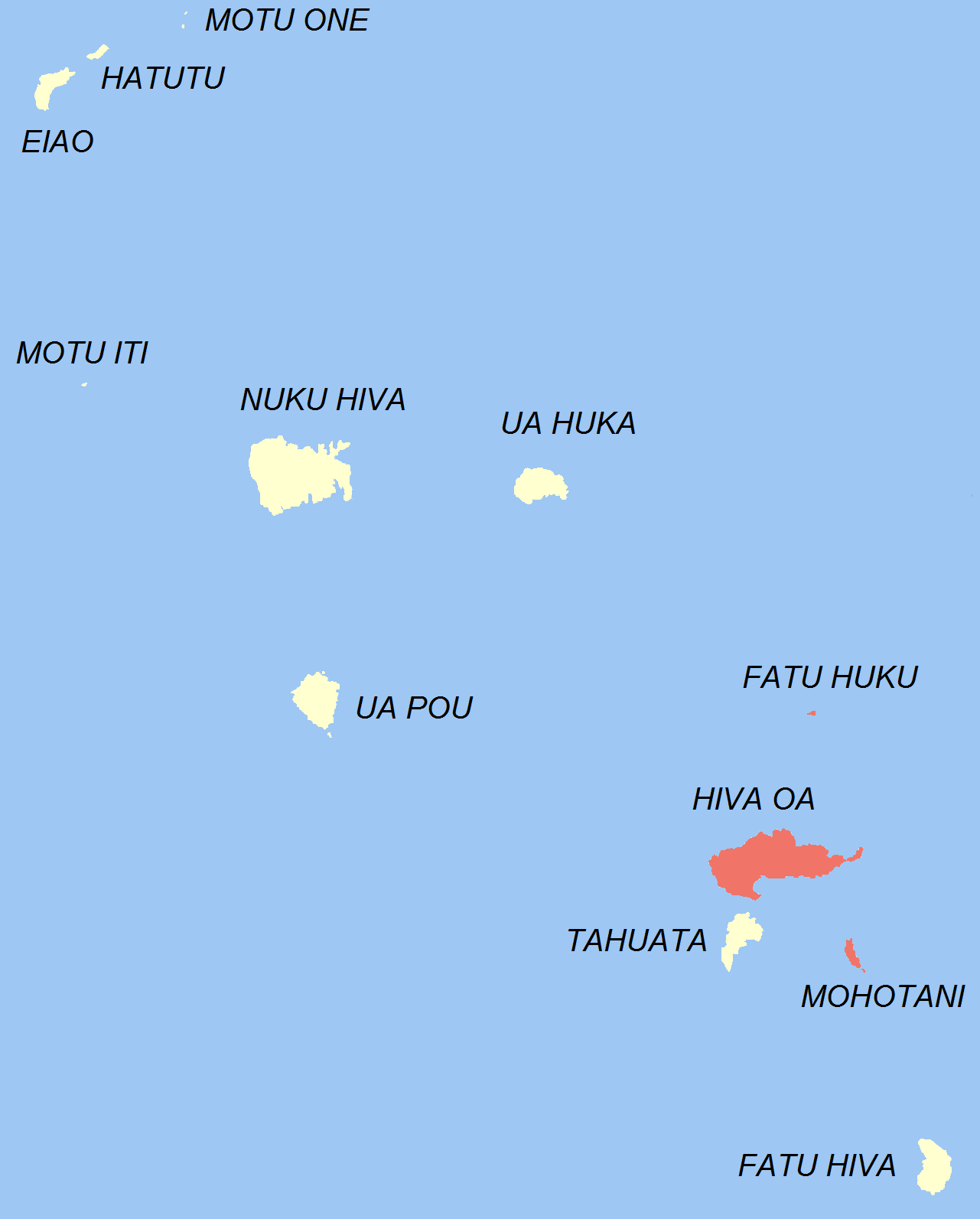
- Location of Hiva Oa within the Marquesas Islands

Geography
- Location: South Pacific Ocean
- Coordinates: 9°45′S 139°00′W
- Archipelago: Marquesas Islands
- Area: 316 km^{2} (122 sq mi)
- Highest elevation: 1,213 m (3980 ft)
- Highest point: Temetiu

Administration
- France
- Overseas country: French Polynesia

Demographics
- Population: 2,190 (2012)
- Pop. density: 6.9/km^{2} (17.9/sq mi)

With its 320 square kilometres (124 square miles), Hiva Oa (Marquesan: Hivaʻoa) is the second largest island in the Marquesas Islands, in French Polynesia, an overseas territory of France in the Pacific Ocean. It is the largest island of the southern Marquesas group. Around 2,200 people reside on the island. A volcano, Temetiu, is Hiva Oa's highest point, reaching an elevation of 1,269 m (4,163 ft.)

== History ==
=== Colonial period ===
The first recorded sighting of Hiva Oa by the Europeans was by the Spanish expedition of Álvaro de Mendaña on 21 July 1595. They charted it as Dominica. German forces briefly occupied the island under the command of Admiral Von Spee in October 1914.

== Overview ==
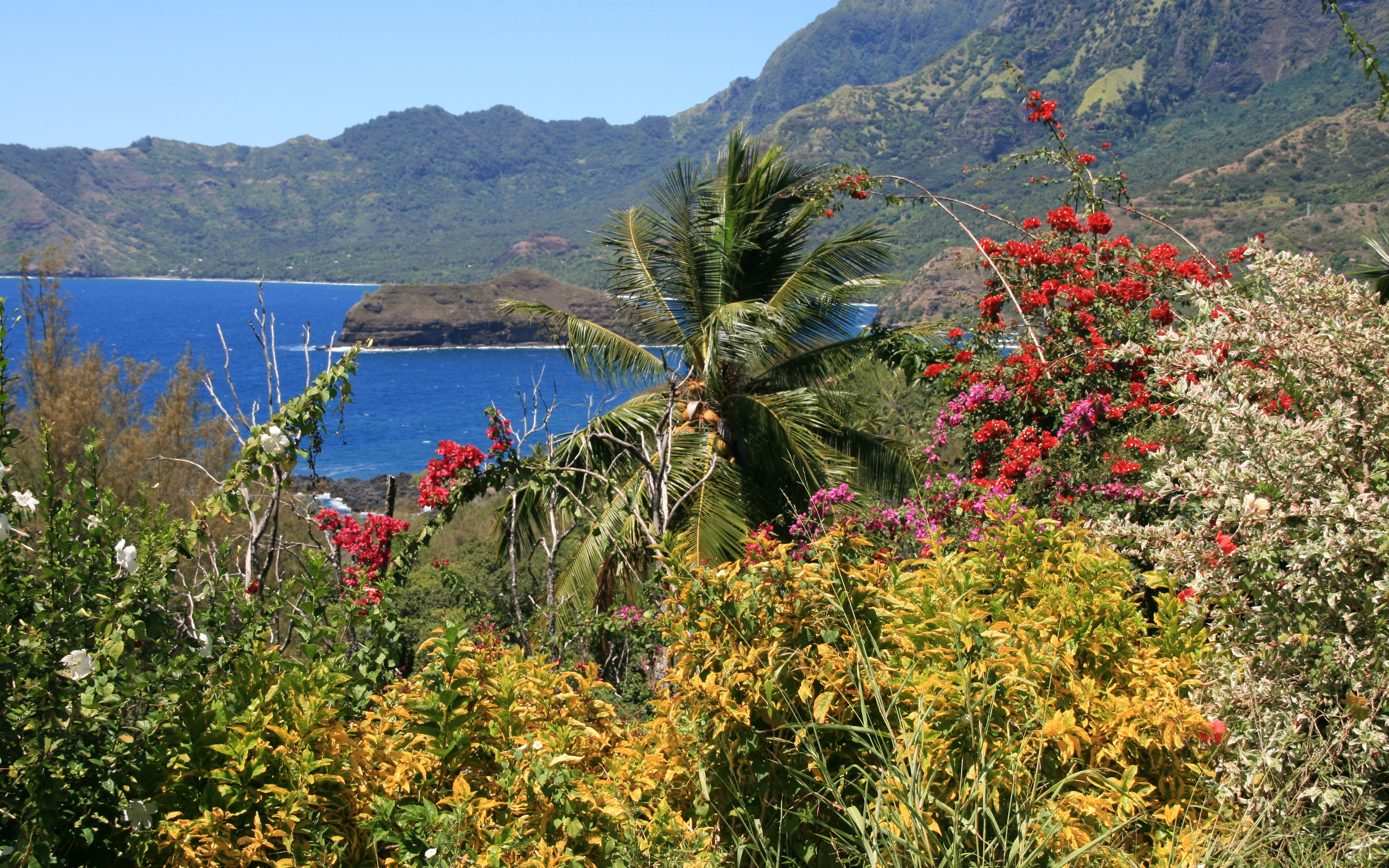
Hiva Oa. View of Ta'a Oa Bay from the road between Atuona and Puamau.

Administratively, Hiva Oa is part of the commune (municipality) of Hiva-Oa, itself in the administrative subdivision of the Marquesas Islands. Atuona, on the coast of Hiva Oa island, is the administrative centre of the commune. Atuona was formerly the seat of government for all of the Marquesas Islands, but it has been replaced by Taioha'e on Nuku Hiva island.

The island is famous as the final home of French painter Paul Gauguin and Belgian singer Jacques Brel, both of whom are buried in Calvary Cemetery, overlooking Atuona. It is also home to the largest tiki sculptures in French Polynesia.

In late pre-European times, the island was nearly evenly divided into two provinces—Nuku in the west, and Pepane in the east.

== Geography ==
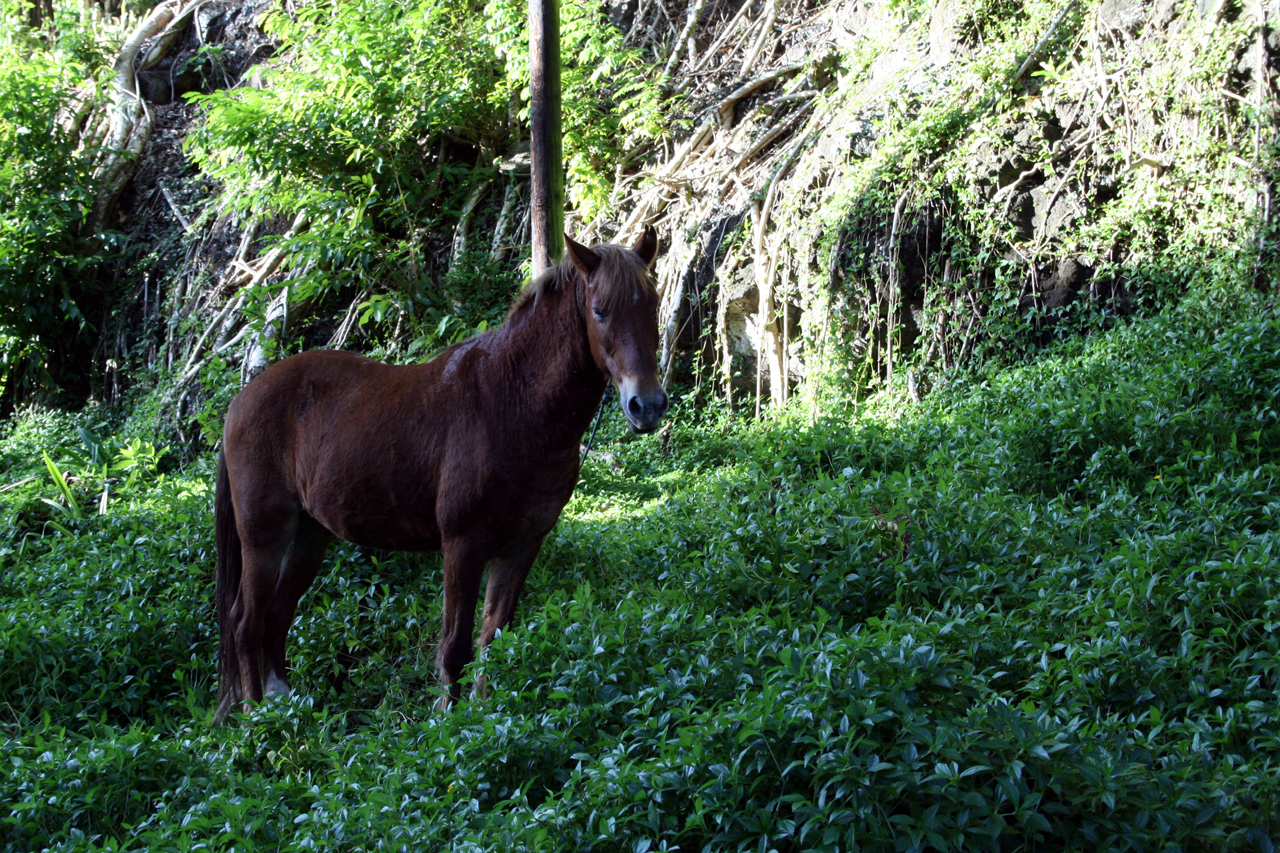
Horse of the Marquesas Islands in Hiva Oa

Hiva Oa is the largest and most fertile of the southern Marquesas islands and second only to Nuku Hiva in size. Similar to all the larger Marquesas, Hiva Oa features cliffs abruptly rising from the ocean to a rugged interior spine of volcanic mountains, ridges, and deep, isolated valleys. Unlike most other Polynesian islands near the equator, no fringing coral reefs protect Hiva Oa from the pounding of the ocean, and only a few sheltered anchorages and sandy beaches are scattered around the coast. Travel along the shoreline is by boat, as most of the coastal terrain is too rugged for roads. A few dirt roads traverse the interior, linking seacoast villages and settlements. Atuona Airport is located at an elevation of 1,481 feet (451 m) on a plateau near the center of the island and has an asphalt-surfaced runway 3,986 feet (1,215 m) long with daily flights to other Marquesas islands and Tahiti.

The outstanding geologic characteristic of Hiva Oa is the collapsed volcano Temetiu. Semi-circular Ta'a Oa bay, also called the Bay of Traitors, is in the crater of the volcano whose walls rise sharply 1,000 metres (3,300 ft) above the bay. Within Ta'a Oa are Atuona Bay and adjacent Taha Uku, which are the best anchorages on the island.

Hiva Oa is separated from the nearby island of Tahuata to its south by a 2.5 miles (4.0 km) wide channel called Ha'ava or the Canal de Bordelais.

=== Climate ===
Temperatures in the Marquesas are stable year-round, but precipitation is highly variable. Precipitation is much greater on the north and east (windward) parts of the islands and much less on the western (leeward) parts. Droughts, sometimes lasting several years, are frequent and seem to be associated with the El Niño phenomenon. The highest annual rainfall recorded in Atuona is 148.2 inches (3,760 mm); the lowest is 22 inches (560 mm).

Climate data for Hiva-Oa (1991−2020 normals, extremes 1939−present)
Month	Jan	Feb	Mar	Apr	May	Jun	Jul	Aug	Sep	Oct	Nov	Dec	Year
Record high °C (°F)	35.3 (95.5)	35.0 (95.0)	35.0 (95.0)	35.0 (95.0)	34.7 (94.5)	33.8 (92.8)	33.0 (91.4)	32.6 (90.7)	34.2 (93.6)	34.7 (94.5)	35.0 (95.0)	36.1 (97.0)	36.1 (97.0)
Mean daily maximum °C (°F)	31.2 (88.2)	31.5 (88.7)	31.5 (88.7)	31.2 (88.2)	30.5 (86.9)	29.6 (85.3)	29.0 (84.2)	29.0 (84.2)	29.6 (85.3)	30.4 (86.7)	30.9 (87.6)	31.1 (88.0)	30.5 (86.9)
Daily mean °C (°F)	27.3 (81.1)	27.6 (81.7)	27.8 (82.0)	27.6 (81.7)	27.1 (80.8)	26.4 (79.5)	26.0 (78.8)	25.8 (78.4)	26.2 (79.2)	26.6 (79.9)	26.9 (80.4)	27.2 (81.0)	26.9 (80.4)
Mean daily minimum °C (°F)	23.4 (74.1)	23.7 (74.7)	24.0 (75.2)	24.0 (75.2)	23.7 (74.7)	23.3 (73.9)	22.9 (73.2)	22.6 (72.7)	22.7 (72.9)	22.7 (72.9)	23.0 (73.4)	23.3 (73.9)	23.3 (73.9)
Record low °C (°F)	19.2 (66.6)	18.3 (64.9)	19.9 (67.8)	19.8 (67.6)	19.2 (66.6)	18.5 (65.3)	17.7 (63.9)	16.8 (62.2)	18.0 (64.4)	18.0 (64.4)	18.6 (65.5)	17.5 (63.5)	16.8 (62.2)
Average precipitation mm (inches)	134.4 (5.29)	116.1 (4.57)	178.2 (7.02)	170.2 (6.70)	135.7 (5.34)	151.7 (5.97)	151.2 (5.95)	121.1 (4.77)	87.9 (3.46)	87.1 (3.43)	94.1 (3.70)	68.6 (2.70)	1,496.3 (58.91)
Average precipitation days (≥ 1.0 mm)	12.6	12.8	15.2	13.6	14.4	14.9	16.4	14.8	11.9	12.0	11.7	9.9	160.1
Mean monthly sunshine hours	219.2	202.3	210.5	196.3	194.1	172.7	174.6	185.7	197.9	222.4	214.1	228.1	2,417.8
Source: Météo-France

Climate data for Atuona, Hiva Oa
Month	Jan	Feb	Mar	Apr	May	Jun	Jul	Aug	Sep	Oct	Nov	Dec	Year
Mean daily maximum °C (°F)	30 (86)	31 (87)	31 (87)	31 (87)	29 (85)	29 (84)	28 (83)	28 (83)	29 (84)	29 (85)	30 (86)	30 (86)	29 (85)
Daily mean °C (°F)	27 (81)	27 (81)	28 (82)	28 (82)	27 (80)	26 (79)	26 (78)	26 (78)	26 (79)	26 (79)	27 (80)	27 (81)	27 (80)
Mean daily minimum °C (°F)	23 (74)	24 (75)	24 (76)	24 (76)	24 (75)	23 (74)	23 (74)	23 (73)	23 (73)	23 (73)	23 (74)	23 (74)	23 (74)
Average precipitation mm (inches)	110 (4.5)	91 (3.6)	110 (4.4)	120 (4.6)	120 (4.8)	180 (6.9)	120 (4.8)	100 (4)	160 (6.2)	79 (3.1)	66 (2.6)	89 (3.5)	1,290 (50.9)
Source: Weatherbase

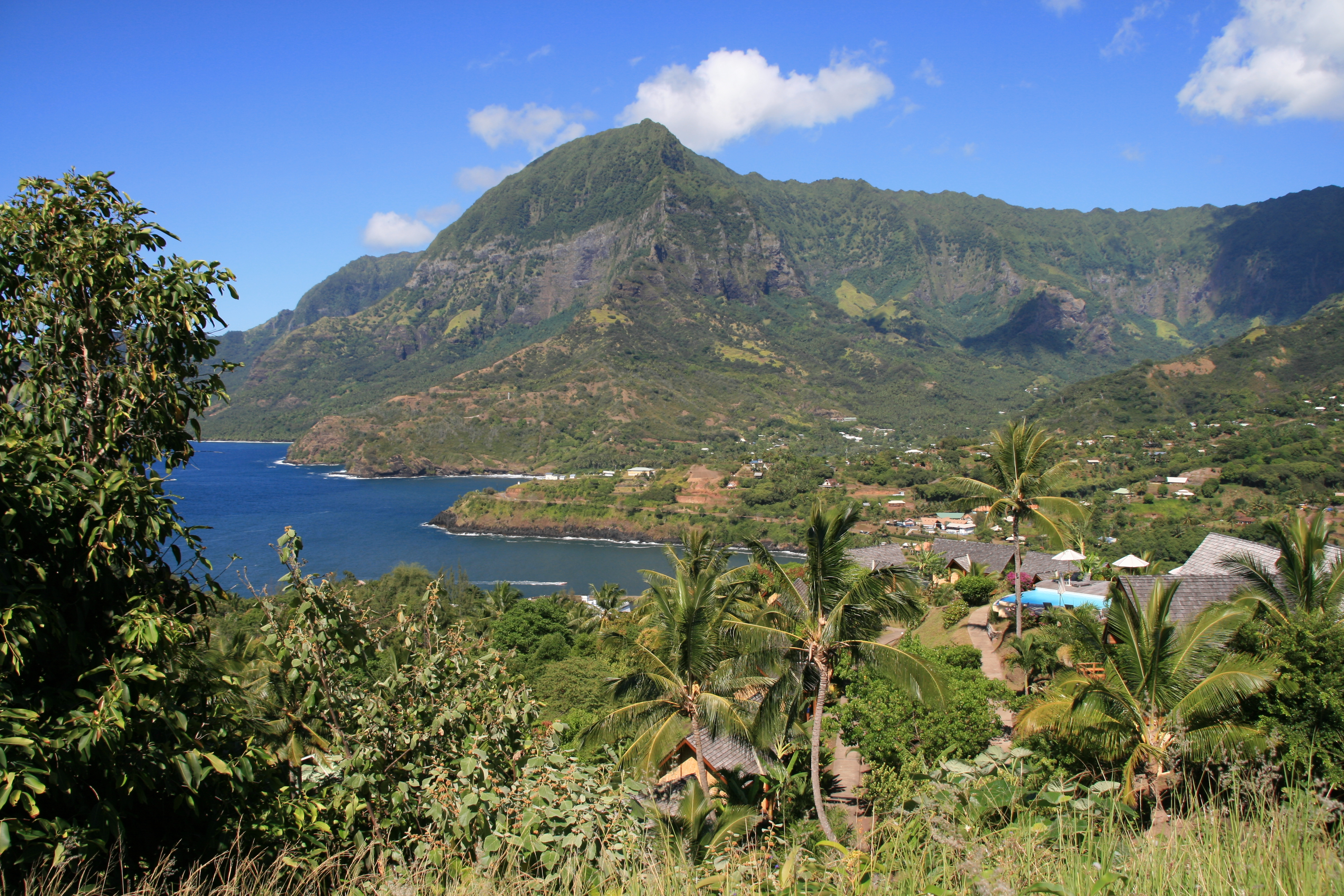
View of Atuona, the main village of Hiva-Oa, Marquesas Islands, French Polynesia.

=== Geology ===
The island is of volcanic origin. Geologically, Hiva Oa belongs to the Marquesas Linear Volcanic Chain, which formed from a hot spot on the Pacific Plate and is moving west-northwest at a rate of 103 to 118 mm. per year. The magmatic rocks on the island are between 1.63 and 4.26 million years old, but volcanic activity has not yet been completely extinguished. Not far from the road from Atuona to Ta'aoa, further west, some mud pots and small solfataras can be seen.

=== Flora ===
Like Nuku Hiva, Hiva Oa, the second-largest island in the archipelago, has a relatively high biodiversity for the South Pacific. A total of 205 native plants - 24 of them endemic - and 178 exotic species have been identified. Among the richest and most widespread native species on the island are ferns with a high number of endemic species. They cover large areas of the inaccessible, humid, and shady valleys' incisions. Among the idiocorophytes (ancient autochthonous species) are probably the coconut palm and the screw tree, which are widespread in the lowlands.

Anthropochorophytes, such as breadfruit trees and Tahitian chestnut (Inocarpus edulis), already introduced by Polynesian settlers, predominate in the lowland and midland regions. A threat to native plant communities could be bamboo, which is not native to the island and has already formed extensive groves in some places.

In the higher, more inaccessible areas of the island, the natural habitats remain almost unchanged. The north, shaded from wind and rain by the mountains, is largely arid.

=== Fauna ===
The fauna of the Marquesas Islands is limited to land and sea birds, insects, reptiles, butterflies, and spiders. The reptiles of this area include a few species of gecko and skinks. Birds include the Marquesas warbler (Acrocephalus mendanae mendanae) endemic to Hiva Oa and the neighboring island of Tahuata, the Marquesan Kingfisher, the Marquesan monarch, and several species of dove. The island used to be home to Marquesan swamphen, before they went extinct. There are no animals that are dangerous to humans. The nono fly (Simulium buissoni), a type of black fly which occurs in the interior, is extremely unpleasant.

== Population ==
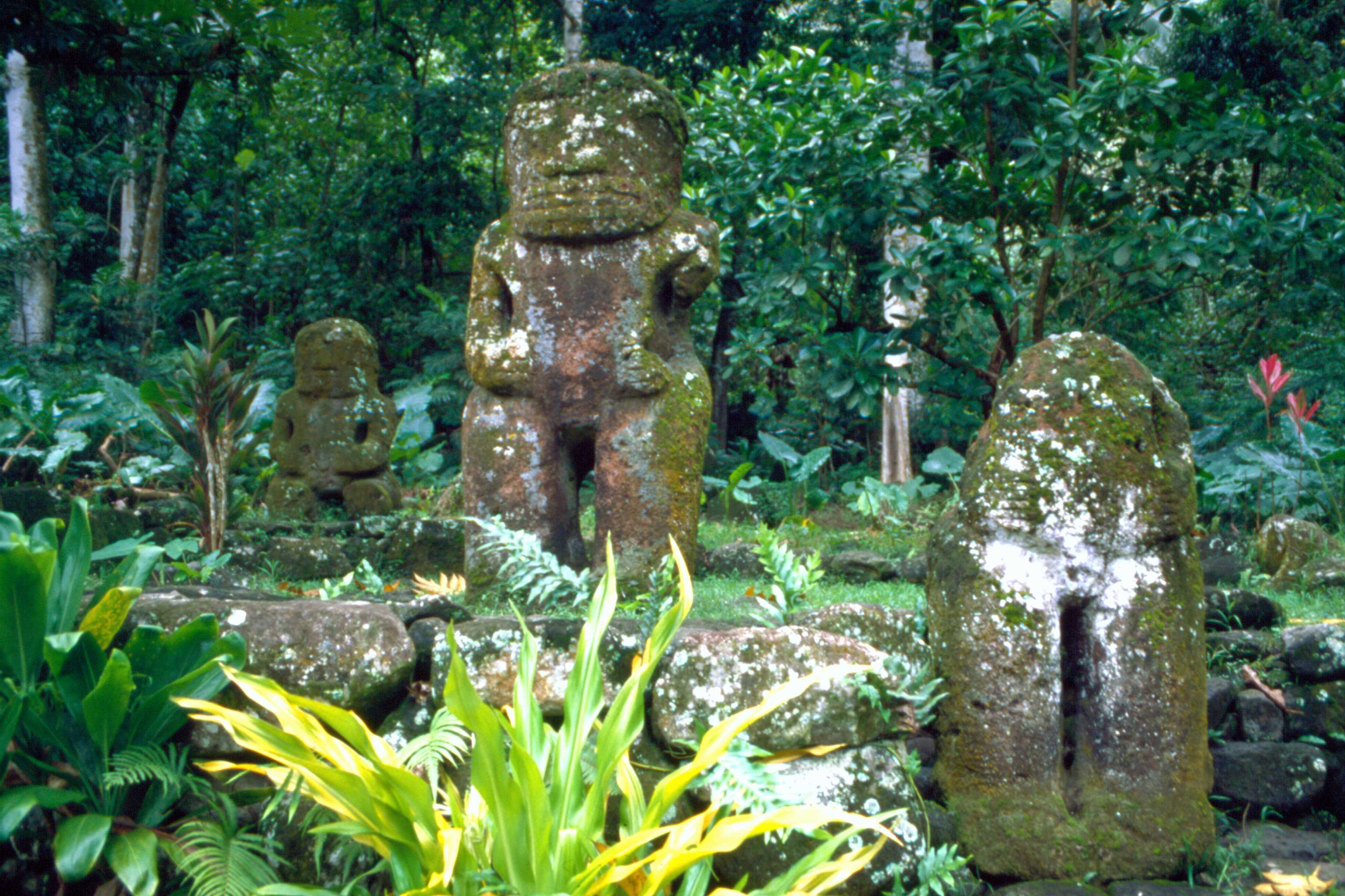
These stone statues are called Tikis and are abundant on Hiva Oa, especially near the village of Puama'u on the northeastern coast.

In 2012, the population of Hiva Oa was 2,190, of which 1,845 lived in the commune of Atuona and 345 in the village of Puama'u. The inhabitants speak the southern Marquesan language, related to other Polynesian languages, and French.

=== Religion ===
The population is primarily Christian, due to Catholic missionaries. The Catholic Church controls six religious buildings on the island, including the Church of the Immaculate Conception (Église de l'Immaculée Conception) in Atuona; the Church of Saint Anne (Église de Sainte-Anne) in Hanaiapa; the Church of Our Lady of Lourdes (Église de Notre-Dame-de-Lourdes) in Hanapa'aoa; the Church of Saint Joseph (Église de Saint-Joseph) in Nahoe; the Church of the Sacred Heart (Église du Sacré-Cœur) in Puamau; and the Church of Our Lady of the Sacred Heart (Église de Notre-Dame du Sacré-Cœur) in Ta'aoaoa.

According to local myth, the gods created the Marquesas as their home. Therefore, all the islands have names related to house construction: Hiva Oa means 'long ridge'.

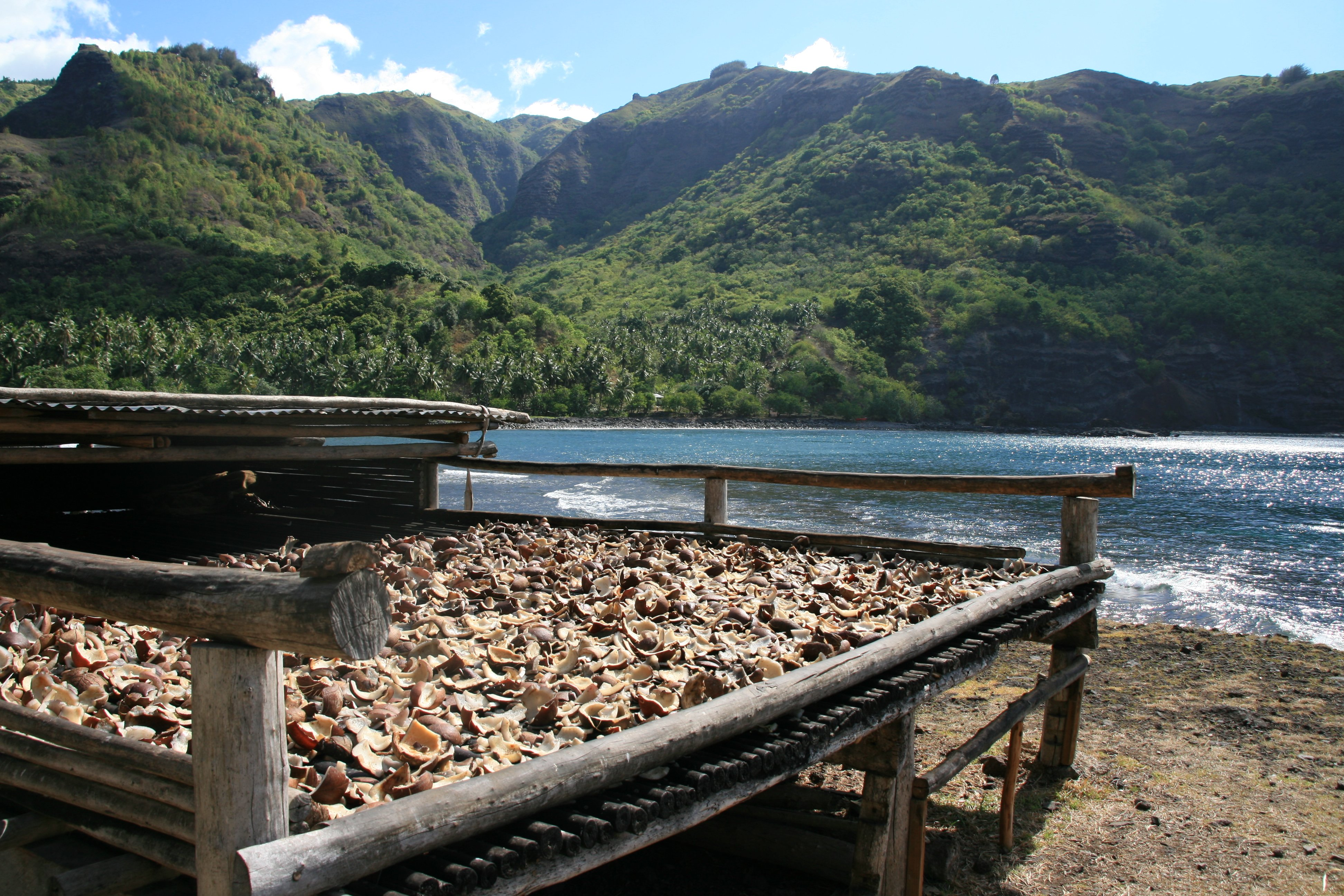
Copra drying in the village of Hanaiapa, Hiva Oa Island, Marquesas Islands.

== Economy ==
Subsistence agriculture, a combination of fishing, pig and chicken farming, and the cultivation of staple crops such as breadfruit, coconut, yam, taro, sweet potatoes, and bananas, remains the basis of the island's economy. Part of the copra is grown for export. Tourism has so far existed only to a small extent, but it is economically important, as otherwise there would be few jobs on the island. The currency is the CFP franc, which is pegged to the euro.

== Infrastructure ==
The settlements are only partially connected by paved roads. As the existing ones are also steep and winding, the preferred means of transport between the villages is still by boat. The west and the island's mountainous interior are largely undeveloped.

The airport, with a 1,250 m paved runway, is located on the Tepuna plateau, northeast of Atuona, and is connected to the village by a winding road.

Atuona has a fairly modern infrastructure, with a hospital, a medical and dental office, a post office (with satellite phone), a bank (with ATM), a national Gendarmerie station, a courthouse, schools with preschool (école maternelle et primaire) and a high school (Collège Sainte Anne), as well as a Catholic church and a Protestant church. For tourists, there are hotels and small private pensions, as well as restaurants and bars.

Larger cruise ships can also enter Atuona Bay. However, they are usually anchored, and passengers are disembarked. Regular supply ships to/from Tahiti dock at the harbor pier.

== Tourism ==
=== Places of interest ===
The village of Puamau is 45 km from Atuona (a 2.5-hour drive up a steep, winding road). On the outskirts of the village is a large ceremonial platform, said to be the burial place of Queen Vahine Titoiani. There are large stone tikis carved on two corners of the platform.

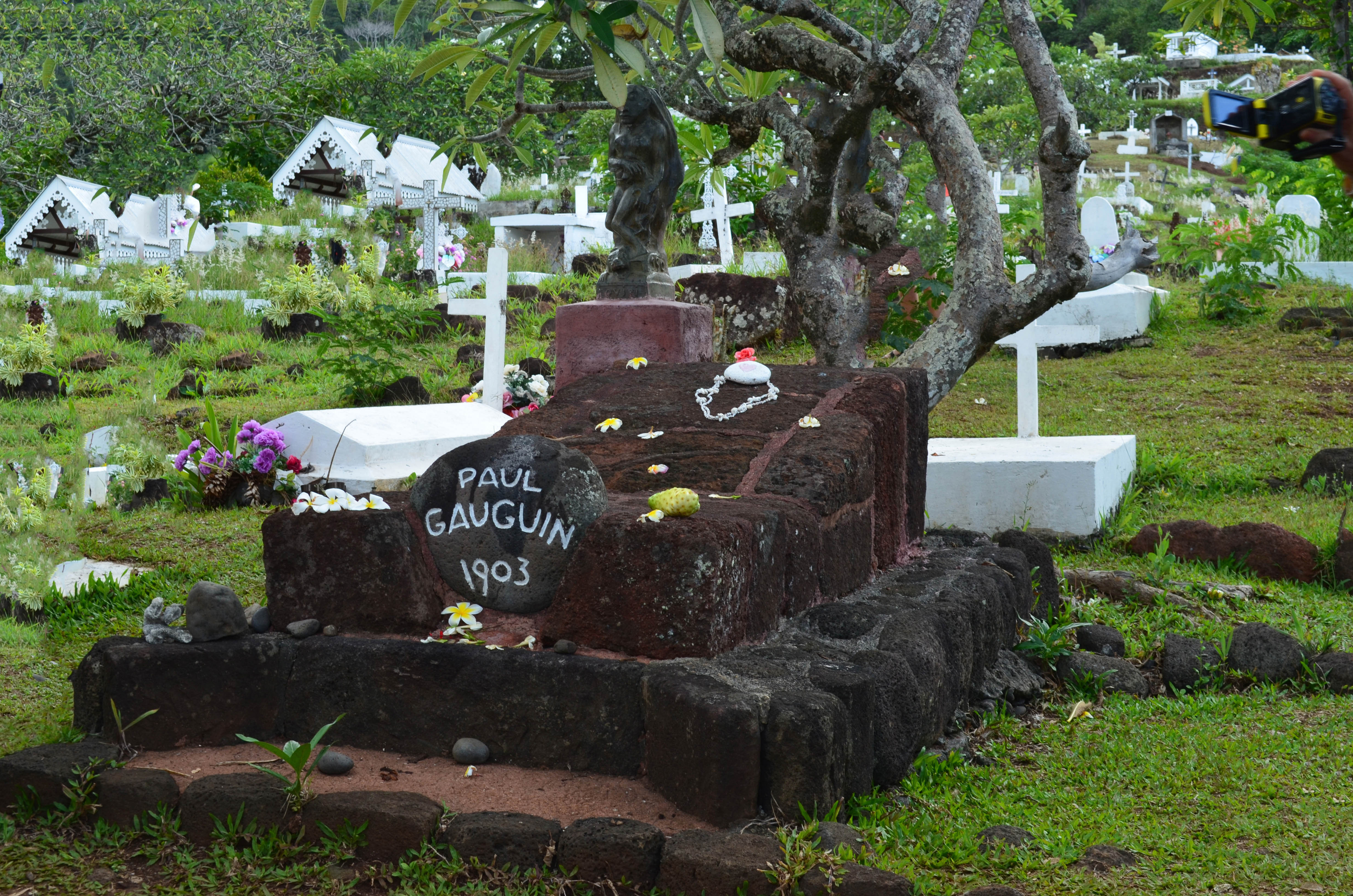
Paul Gauguin Gravesite

In the Puamau valley, about two kilometers from the coast, is Ipona (formerly: Oipona), the largest and most important historical site in the Marquesas. The valley once belonged to the influential Naiki tribe, which also controlled the Atuona region. After the Naiki captured and consumed the chief of the neighboring tribe, Tio'o, the clans of the Hanapa'aoa district took revenge and wiped out the Naiki. The victors erected a tapu on Ipona and installed tikis. After the introduction of Christianity, this place of worship fell into disuse.

The Marae Takii, now well restored and consisting of three overlapping terraces, stands at the foot of a cliff and includes 8 stone statues and cyclopean heads. The largest is Tiki Takai'i, the guardian spirit of the valley, at 2.43 meters. However, the most interesting artwork is the Maki'i Taua Pepe figure, unique in the entire South Seas region, which, according to Karl von den Steinen, physician and ethnologist, depicts a priestess or goddess giving birth. According to Thor Heyerdahl, who visited Hiva Oa in 1937, the statue does not resemble a woman giving birth, but "more like an animal swimming," and he compared it to two sculptures of the "alligator god" from the St. Augustine culture. v.d. Steinen's interpretation of a woman in labor is contradicted by the fact that the base emerged from the navel region and not from the loins. He learned from his informants that the statue had long been lying on its back in a thicket and had only "recently" been erected. Another notable site is in the Vustin River valley.

Also notable is the Ta'aoa Valley, west of Atuona, which is filled with huge banyan trees, coconut palms, twenty-meter-tall Barringtonia asiatica, many breadfruit trees, mango trees, and Tahitian chestnuts. Among the dense undergrowth, it is difficult to distinguish most of the houses and ceremonial platforms spread over an area of 3 ha, as little has been excavated and hardly anything has been restored. The Ta'aoa valley belonged to the sphere of influence of the powerful Tiu tribe, which plays a central role in the traditional myths of Hiva Oa. The buildings erected were correspondingly numerous and representative. In the center is a tohua, the largest of the Marquesas. A large tiki stands in the plaza, and a stone head on one of the ceremonial platforms. Taro cultivation terraces have been found in the vicinity of the settlement. Ralph Linton explored this site as part of his expedition to the Marquesas, 1920/21, organized by the Bishop Museum.

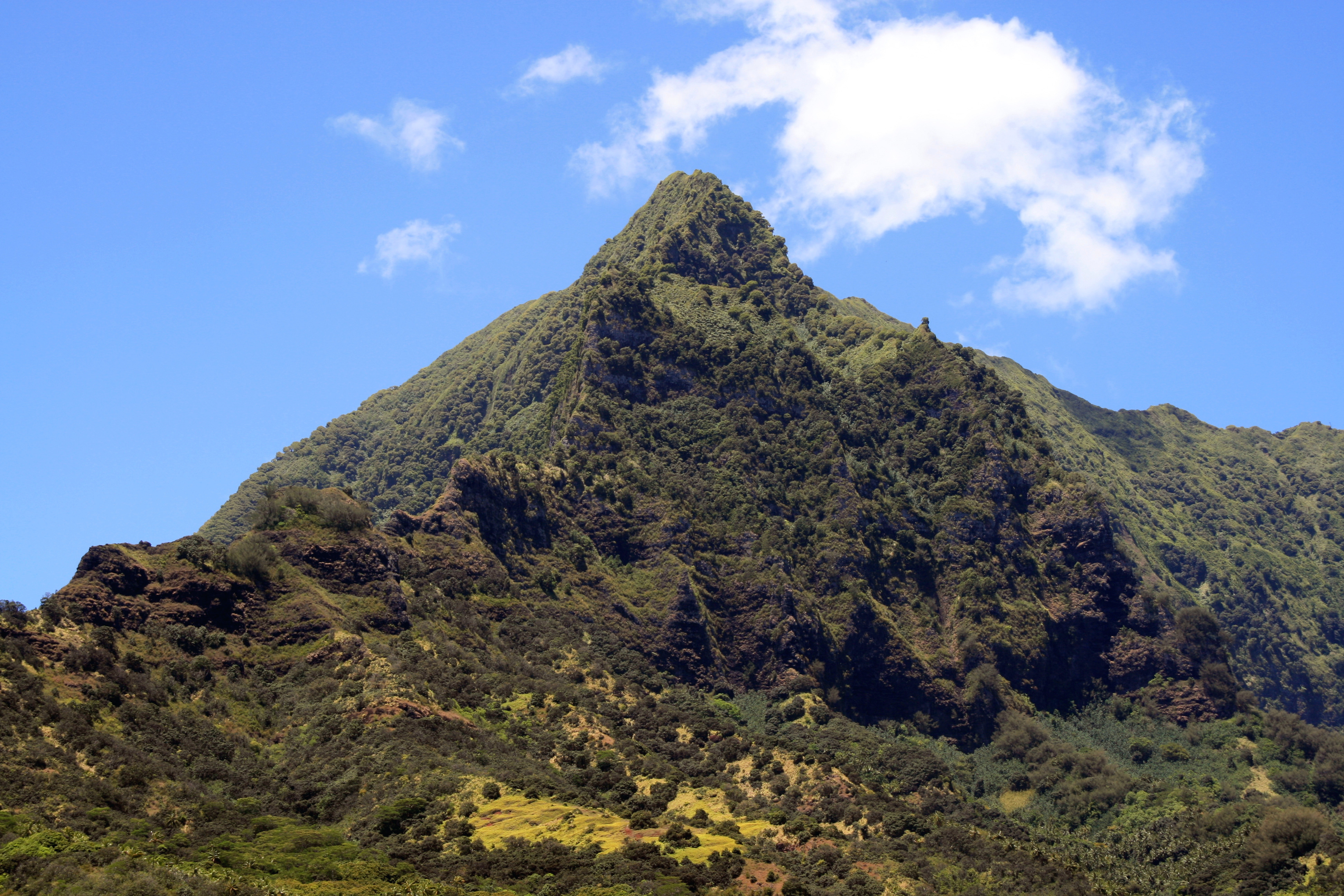
Mont Temetiu

The Eiaone Valley, west of Puamau, is known for its unique and particularly expressive semi-relief petroglyphs. However, most of them are covered by dense vegetation. There are other petroglyphs, stone images, and platforms in the Tahauku and Punae (Punai) valleys east of Atuona.

The Atuona cultural center, dedicated to the painter Paul Gauguin, displays only copies of his paintings, but documents his life in the South Seas. His house, which was right next door, has been reconstructed. In the process, a disused well was found where the later inhabitants had disposed of the painter's personal belongings, including a comb and toothbrush, jugs of wine, empty absinthe bottles, a morphine syringe, and tiger balm.

There are also some Jacques Brel memorabilia in Atuona. In 2003, a hangar was built specifically for his Beechcraft D-50 Twin Bonanza, named "Jojo", which has since been restored. Photos and documents from Brel's stay in the South Seas over several years are also on display here. A monument to Jacques Brel has been erected on a lookout point on the airport road.

In the Calvaire Cemetery (Cimetière Calvaire), located above Atuona, are the graves of Gauguin and Brel. It is sometimes doubted that this is Gauguin's actual grave; it is said that he was buried unmarked and somewhere in the jungle. The cemetery is a much-visited lookout point, offering views of Ta'aoa Bay.

== See also ==
- Haʻava
- Dependent Territory
