= List of birds of French Polynesia =

This is a list of the bird species recorded in French Polynesia. The avifauna of French Polynesia include a total of 175 species, of which 41 are endemic, 15 have been introduced. Of these, 35 species are globally threatened.

This list's taxonomic treatment (designation and sequence of orders, families and species) and nomenclature (common and scientific names) follow the conventions of The Clements Checklist of Birds of the World, 2022 edition. The family accounts at the beginning of each heading reflect this taxonomy, as do the species counts found in each family account. Introduced and accidental species are included in the total counts for French Polynesia.

The following tags have been used to highlight several categories. The commonly occurring native species do not fall into any of these categories.

- (A) Accidental - a species that rarely or accidentally occurs in French Polynesia
- (E) Endemic - a species endemic to French Polynesia
- (I) Introduced - a species introduced to French Polynesia as a consequence, direct or indirect, of human actions
- (Ex) Extinct
- (Ext) Extirpated - a species that no longer occurs in French Polynesia although populations exist elsewhere

== Ducks, geese, and waterfowl ==
Order: Anseriformes Family: Anatidae

Anatidae includes the ducks and most duck-like waterfowl, such as geese and swans. These birds are adapted to an aquatic existence with webbed feet, flattened bills, and feathers that are excellent at shedding water due to an oily coating.

- Northern shoveler, Spatula clypeata
- Pacific black duck, Anas superciliosa
- Northern pintail, Anas acuta (A)

== Pheasants, grouse, and allies ==
Order: Galliformes Family: Phasianidae

The Phasianidae are a family of terrestrial birds which consists of quails, partridges, snowcocks, francolins, spurfowls, tragopans, monals, pheasants, peafowls and jungle fowls. In general, they are plump (although they vary in size) and have broad, relatively short wings.

- Red junglefowl, Gallus gallus (I)
- Ring-necked pheasant, Phasianus colchicus (I)

== Pigeons and doves ==
Order: Columbiformes Family: Columbidae

Pigeons and doves are stout-bodied birds with short necks and short slender bills with a fleshy cere.

- Rock pigeon, Columba livia (I)
- Marquesas ground dove, Alopecoenas rubescens (E)
- Polynesian ground dove, Alopecoenas erythropterus (E)
- Zebra dove, Geopelia striata (I)
- Gray-green fruit-dove, Ptilinopus purpuratus (E)
- Raiatea fruit-dove, Ptilinopus chrysogaster (E)
- Makatea fruit-dove, Ptilinopus chalcurus (E)
- Atoll fruit-dove, Ptilinopus coralensis (E)
- Rapa fruit-dove, Ptilinopus huttoni (E)
- White-capped fruit-dove, Ptilinopus dupetithouarsii (E)
- Red-moustached fruit-dove, Ptilinopus mercierii (E) (Ext)
- Pacific imperial-pigeon, Ducula pacifica (I)
- Polynesian imperial-pigeon, Ducula aurorae (E)
- Marquesas imperial-pigeon, Ducula galeata (E)

== Cuckoos ==
Order: Cuculiformes Family: Cuculidae

The family Cuculidae includes cuckoos, roadrunners and anis. These birds are of variable size with slender bodies, long tails and strong legs. The Old World cuckoos are brood parasites.

- Long-tailed koel, Eudynamys taitensis

== Swifts ==
Order: Caprimulgiformes Family: Apodidae

Swifts are small birds which spend the majority of their lives flying. These birds have very short legs and never settle voluntarily on the ground, perching instead only on vertical surfaces. Many swifts have long swept-back wings which resemble a crescent or boomerang.

- Polynesian swiftlet, Aerodramus leucophaeus (E)
- Marquesan swiftlet, Aerodramus ocistus (E)

== Rails, gallinules, and coots ==
Order: Gruiformes Family: Rallidae

Rallidae is a large family of small to medium-sized birds which includes the rails, crakes, coots and gallinules. Typically they inhabit dense vegetation in damp environments near lakes, swamps or rivers. In general they are shy and secretive birds, making them difficult to observe. Most species have strong legs and long toes which are well adapted to soft uneven surfaces. They tend to have short, rounded wings and to be weak fliers.

- Astolfo's rail, Gallirallus astolfoi (E) (Ext)
- Tahiti rail, Gallirallus pacificus (E) (Ext)
- Marquesan swamphen, Porphyrio paepae (E) (Ext)
- Miller's rail, Zapornia nigra (E) (Ext)
- Spotless crake, Zapornia tabuensis

== Plovers and lapwings ==
Order: Charadriiformes Family: Charadriidae

The family Charadriidae includes the plovers, dotterels and lapwings. They are small to medium-sized birds with compact bodies, short, thick necks and long, usually pointed, wings. They are found in open country worldwide, mostly in habitats near water.

- Black-bellied plover, Pluvialis squatarola (A)
- Pacific golden-plover, Pluvialis fulva
- Masked lapwing, Vanellus miles (A)
- Semipalmated plover, Charadrius semipalmatus (A)

== Sandpipers and allies ==
Order: Charadriiformes Family: Scolopacidae

Scolopacidae is a large diverse family of small to medium-sized shorebirds including the sandpipers, curlews, godwits, shanks, tattlers, woodcocks, snipes, dowitchers and phalaropes. The majority of these species eat small invertebrates picked out of the mud or soil. Variation in length of legs and bills enables multiple species to feed in the same habitat, particularly on the coast, without direct competition for food.

- Bristle-thighed curlew, Numenius tahitiensis
- Whimbrel, Numenius phaeopus (A)
- Bar-tailed godwit, Limosa lapponica (A)
- Ruddy turnstone, Arenaria interpres
- White-winged sandpiper, Prosobonia leucoptera (E) (Ex)
- Moorea sandpiper, Prosobonia ellisi (E) (Ex)
- Tuamotu sandpiper, Prosobonia parvirostris (E)
- Ruff, Calidris pugnax (A)
- Sharp-tailed sandpiper, Calidris acuminata (A)
- Sanderling, Calidris alba
- Buff-breasted sandpiper, Calidris subruficollis (A)
- Pectoral sandpiper, Calidris melanotos
- Gray-tailed tattler, Tringa brevipes
- Wandering tattler, Tringa incana
- Willet, Tringa semipalmata (A)
- Lesser yellowlegs, Tringa flavipes (A)

== Skuas and jaegers ==
Order: Charadriiformes Family: Stercorariidae

The family Stercorariidae are, in general, medium to large birds, typically with grey or brown plumage, often with white markings on the wings. They nest on the ground in temperate and arctic regions and are long-distance migrants.

- South polar skua, Stercorarius maccormicki (A)
- Pomarine jaeger, Stercorarius pomarinus (A)
- Parasitic jaeger, Stercorarius parasiticus (A)
- Long-tailed jaeger, Stercorarius longicaudus (A)

== Gulls, terns, and skimmers ==
Order: Charadriiformes Family: Laridae

Laridae is a family of medium to large seabirds, the gulls, terns, and skimmers. Gulls are typically grey or white, often with black markings on the head or wings. They have stout, longish bills and webbed feet. Terns are a group of generally medium to large seabirds typically with grey or white plumage, often with black markings on the head. Most terns hunt fish by diving but some pick insects off the surface of fresh water. Terns are generally long-lived birds, with several species known to live in excess of 30 years.

- Laughing gull, Leucophaeus atricilla (A)
- Franklin's gull, Leucophaeus pipixcan (A)
- Ring-billed gull, Larus delawarensis (A)
- Brown noddy, Anous stolidus
- Black noddy, Anous minutus
- Blue-gray noddy, Anous cerulea
- White tern, Gygis alba
- Sooty tern, Onychoprion fuscatus
- Gray-backed tern, Onychoprion lunatus
- Bridled tern, Onychoprion anaethetus (A)
- Roseate tern, Sterna dougallii
- Black-naped tern, Sterna sumatrana (A)
- Great crested tern, Thalasseus bergii

== Tropicbirds ==
Order: Phaethontiformes Family: Phaethontidae

Tropicbirds are slender white birds of tropical oceans, with exceptionally long central tail feathers. Their heads and long wings have black markings.

- White-tailed tropicbird, Phaethon lepturus
- Red-billed tropicbird, Phaethon aethereus (A)
- Red-tailed tropicbird, Phaethon rubricauda

== Albatrosses ==
Order: Procellariiformes Family: Diomedeidae

The albatrosses are among the largest of flying birds, and the great albatrosses from the genus Diomedea have the largest wingspans of any extant birds.

- Gray-headed albatross, Thalassarche chrysostoma (A)
- Buller's albatross, Thalassarche bulleri
- Salvin's albatross, Thalassarche salvini (A)
- Chatham albatross, Thalassarche eremita (A)
- Black-browed albatross, Thalassarche melanophris (A)
- Light-mantled albatross, Phoebetria palpebrata (A)
- Royal albatross, Diomedea epomophora
- Wandering albatross, Diomedea exulans

== Southern storm-petrels ==
Order: Procellariiformes Family: Oceanitidae

The southern storm-petrels are relatives of the petrels and are the smallest seabirds. They feed on planktonic crustaceans and small fish picked from the surface, typically while hovering. The flight is fluttering and sometimes bat-like.

- Wilson's storm-petrel, Oceanites oceanicus (A)
- White-faced storm-petrel, Pelagodroma marina (A)
- White-bellied storm-petrel, Fregetta grallaria
- Black-bellied storm-petrel, Fregetta tropica (A)
- Polynesian storm-petrel, Nesofregetta fuliginosa

== Northern storm-petrels ==
Order: Procellariiformes Family: Hydrobatidae

Though the members of this family are similar in many respects to the southern storm-petrels, including their general appearance and habits, there are enough genetic differences to warrant their placement in a separate family.

- Leach's storm petrel, Hydrobates leucorhous
- Band-rumped storm-petrel, Hydrobates castro (A)

== Shearwaters and petrels ==
Order: Procellariiformes Family: Procellariidae

The procellariids are the main group of medium-sized "true petrels", characterised by united nostrils with medium septum and a long outer functional primary.

- Southern giant-petrel, Macronectes giganteus (A)
- Northern giant-petrel, Macronectes halli (A)
- Cape petrel, Daption capense (A)
- Gray-faced petrel, Pterodroma gouldi (A)
- Kermadec petrel, Pterodroma neglecta
- Herald petrel, Pterodroma heraldica
- Murphy's petrel, Pterodroma ultima
- Providence petrel, Pterodroma solandri
- Henderson petrel, Pterodroma atrata
- Soft-plumaged petrel, Pterodroma mollis (A)
- White-headed petrel, Pterodroma lessonii (A)
- Mottled petrel, Pterodroma inexpectata (A)
- Juan Fernandez petrel, Pterodroma externa
- Hawaiian petrel, Pterodroma sandwichensis (A)
- White-necked petrel, Pterodroma cervicalis
- Black-winged petrel, Pterodroma nigripennis
- Cook's petrel, Pterodroma cookii (A)
- Gould's petrel, Pterodroma leucoptera
- Collared petrel, Pterodroma brevipes
- Stejneger's petrel, Pterodroma longirostris (A)
- Pycroft's petrel, Pterodroma pycrofti (A)
- Phoenix petrel, Pterodroma alba
- Blue petrel, Halobaena caerulea
- Bulwer's petrel, Bulweria bulwerii
- Tahiti petrel, Pseudobulweria rostrata
- Gray petrel, Procellaria cinerea (A)
- White-chinned petrel, Procellaria aequinoctialis (A)
- Parkinson's petrel, Procellaria parkinsoni (A)
- Pink-footed shearwater, Ardenna creatopus (A)
- Flesh-footed shearwater, Ardenna carneipes (A)
- Wedge-tailed shearwater, Ardenna pacificus
- Buller's shearwater, Ardenna bulleri (A)
- Sooty shearwater, Ardenna griseus (A)
- Short-tailed shearwater, Ardenna tenuirostris (A)
- Christmas shearwater, Puffinus nativitatis
- Townsend's shearwater, Puffinus auricularis
- Rapa shearwater, Puffinus myrtae
- Tropical shearwater, Puffinus bailloni

== Frigatebirds ==
Order: Suliformes Family: Fregatidae

Frigatebirds are large seabirds usually found over tropical oceans. They are large, black-and-white or completely black, with long wings and deeply forked tails. The males have coloured inflatable throat pouches. They do not swim or walk and cannot take off from a flat surface. Having the largest wingspan-to-body-weight ratio of any bird, they are essentially aerial, able to stay aloft for more than a week.

- Lesser frigatebird, Fregata ariel
- Great frigatebird, Fregata minor

== Boobies and gannets ==
Order: Suliformes Family: Sulidae

The sulids comprise the gannets and boobies. Both groups are medium to large coastal seabirds that plunge-dive for fish.

- Masked booby, Sula dactylatra
- Brown booby, Sula leucogaster
- Red-footed booby, Sula sula
- Abbott's booby, Papasula abbotti (Ext)

== Herons, egrets, and bitterns ==
Order: Pelecaniformes Family: Ardeidae

The family Ardeidae contains the bitterns, herons, and egrets. Herons and egrets are medium to large wading birds with long necks and legs. Bitterns tend to be shorter necked and more wary. Members of Ardeidae fly with their necks retracted, unlike other long-necked birds such as storks, ibises and spoonbills.

- Great blue heron, Ardea herodias (A)
- Great egret, Ardea alba (A)
- Pacific reef-heron, Egretta sacra
- Cattle egret, Bubulcus ibis (A)
- Striated heron, Butorides striata

== Hawks, eagles, and kites ==
Order: Accipitriformes Family: Accipitridae

Accipitridae is a family of birds of prey, which includes hawks, eagles, kites, harriers and Old World vultures. These birds have powerful hooked beaks for tearing flesh from their prey, strong legs, powerful talons and keen eyesight.

- Swamp harrier, Circus approximans (I)

== Barn-owls ==
Order: Strigiformes Family: Tytonidae

Barn-owls are medium to large owls with large heads and characteristic heart-shaped faces. They have long strong legs with powerful talons.

- Eastern barn owl, Tyto javanica

== Owls ==
Order: Strigiformes Family: Strigidae

The typical owls are small to large solitary nocturnal birds of prey. They have large forward-facing eyes and ears, a hawk-like beak and a conspicuous circle of feathers around each eye called a facial disk.

- Great horned owl, Bubo virginianus (I)

== Kingfishers ==
Order: Coraciiformes Family: Alcedinidae

Kingfishers are medium-sized birds with large heads, long, pointed bills, short legs and stubby tails.

- Marquesas kingfisher, Todirhamphus godeffroyi (E)
- Society kingfisher, Todirhamphus veneratus (E)
- Mangareva kingfisher, Todirhamphus gambieri (E)
- Chattering kingfisher, Todirhamphus tuta

== Falcons and caracaras ==
Order: Falconiformes Family: Falconidae

Falconidae is a family of diurnal birds of prey. They differ from hawks, eagles and kites in that they kill with their beaks instead of their talons.

- Peregrine falcon, Falco peregrinus

== Old World parrots ==
Order: Psittaciformes Family: Psittaculidae

Characteristic features of parrots include a strong curved bill, an upright stance, strong legs, and clawed zygodactyl feet. Many parrots are vividly colored, and some are multi-colored. In size they range from 8 cm (3.1 in) to 1 m (3.3 ft) in length. Old World parrots are found from Africa east across south and southeast Asia and Oceania to Australia and New Zealand.

- Raiatea parakeet, Cyanoramphus ulietanus (E) (Ex)
- Black-fronted parakeet, Cyanoramphus zealandicus (E) (Ex)
- Kuhl's lorikeet, Vini kuhlii (E)
- Blue lorikeet, Vini peruviana (E)
- Ultramarine lorikeet, Vini ultramarina (E)

== Monarch flycatchers ==
Order: Passeriformes Family: Monarchidae

The monarch flycatchers are small to medium-sized insectivorous passerines which hunt by flycatching.

- Tahiti monarch, Pomarea nigra (E)
- Maupiti monarch, Pomarea pomarea (E) (Ex)
- Eiao monarch, Pomarea fluxa (E) (Ex)
- Nuku Hiva monarch, Pomarea nukuhivae (E) (Ex)
- Iphis monarch, Pomarea iphis (E)
- Ua Pou monarch, Pomarea mira (E)
- Marquesas monarch, Pomarea mendozae (E)
- Fatuhiva monarch, Pomarea whitneyi (E)

== Reed warblers and allies ==
Order: Passeriformes Family: Acrocephalidae

The members of this family are usually rather large for "warblers". Most are rather plain olivaceous brown above with much yellow to beige below. They are usually found in open woodland, reedbeds, or tall grass. The family occurs mostly in southern to western Eurasia and surroundings, but it also ranges far into the Pacific, with some species in Africa.

- Southern Marquesan reed warbler, Acrocephalus mendanae (E)
- Rimatara reed warbler, Acrocephalus rimatarae (E)
- Society Islands reed warbler, Acrocephalus musae (E) (Ex)
- Tahiti reed warbler, Acrocephalus caffer (E)
- Moorea reed warbler, Acrocephalus longirostris (E)
- Northern Marquesan reed warbler, Acrocephalus percernis (E)
- Tuamotu reed warbler, Acrocephalus atyphus (E)
- Mangareva reed warbler, Acrocephalus astrolabii (E) (Ex)

== Swallows ==
Order: Passeriformes Family: Hirundinidae

The family Hirundinidae is adapted to aerial feeding. They have a slender streamlined body, long pointed wings and a short bill with a wide gape. The feet are adapted to perching rather than walking, and the front toes are partially joined at the base.

- Bank swallow, Riparia riparia
- Barn swallow, Hirundo rustica
- Tahiti swallow, Hirundo tahitica (E)

== Bulbuls ==
Order: Passeriformes Family: Pycnonotidae

Bulbuls are medium-sized songbirds. Some are colourful with yellow, red or orange vents, cheeks, throats or supercilia, but most are drab, with uniform olive-brown to black plumage. Some species have distinct crests.

- Red-vented bulbul, Pycnonotus cafer (I)

== White-eyes, yuhinas, and allies ==
Order: Passeriformes Family: Zosteropidae

The white-eyes are small and mostly undistinguished, their plumage above being generally some dull colour like greenish-olive, but some species have a white or bright yellow throat, breast or lower parts, and several have buff flanks. As their name suggests, many species have a white ring around each eye.

- Silvereye, Zosterops lateralis (I)

== Starlings ==
Order: Passeriformes Family: Sturnidae

Starlings are small to medium-sized passerine birds. Their flight is strong and direct and they are very gregarious. Their preferred habitat is fairly open country. They eat insects and fruit. Plumage is typically dark with a metallic sheen.

- Common myna, Acridotheres tristis (I)

== Old World flycatchers ==
Order: Passeriformes Family: Muscicapidae

Old World flycatchers are a large group of small passerine birds native to the Old World. They are mainly small arboreal insectivores. The appearance of these birds is highly varied, but they mostly have weak songs and harsh calls.

- Northern wheatear, Oenanthe oenanthe

== Weavers and allies ==
Order: Passeriformes Family: Ploceidae

The weavers are small passerine birds related to the finches. They are seed-eating birds with rounded conical bills. The males of many species are brightly coloured, usually in red or yellow and black, some species show variation in colour only in the breeding season.

- Black-headed weaver, Ploceus melanocephalus (I)

== Waxbills and allies ==
Order: Passeriformes Family: Estrildidae

The estrildid finches are small passerine birds of the Old World tropics and Australasia. They are gregarious and often colonial seed eaters with short thick but pointed bills. They are all similar in structure and habits, but have wide variation in plumage colours and patterns.

- Common waxbill, Estrilda astrild (I)
- Red-browed firetail, Neochmia temporalis (I)
- Chestnut-breasted munia, Lonchura castaneothorax (I)

== Old World sparrows ==
Order: Passeriformes Family: Passeridae

Old World sparrows are small passerine birds. In general, sparrows tend to be small, plump, brown or grey birds with short tails and short powerful beaks. Old World sparrow are seed eaters, but they also consume small insects.

- House sparrow, Passer domesticus (A)

== Wagtails and pipits ==
Order: Passeriformes Family: Motacillidae

Motacillidae is a family of small passerine birds with medium to long tails. They include the wagtails, longclaws and pipits. They are slender, ground feeding insectivores of open country.

- White wagtail, Motacilla alba

== Tanagers ==
Order: Passeriformes Family: Thraupidae

The tanagers are a large group of small to medium-sized passerine birds restricted to the New World, mainly in the tropics. Many species are brightly coloured. They are seed eaters, but their preference tends towards fruit and nectar. Most have short, rounded wings.

- Crimson-backed tanager, Ramphocelus dimidiatus (I)

== See also ==
- List of birds
- Lists of birds by region
- Pacific Islands Conservation Research Association (PICRA)
