= List of birds of the Tuamotus =

This is a list of the birds species of the Tuamotus. The avifauna of the Tuamotus include 86 species. Of these, 13 are endemic, and one is extinct.

This list's taxonomic treatment (designation and sequence of orders, families and species) and nomenclature (common and scientific names) follow the conventions of The Clements Checklist of Birds of the World, 2022 edition. The family accounts at the beginning of each heading reflect this taxonomy, as do the species counts found in each family account. Introduced and accidental species are included in the total counts for the Tuamotus.

The following tags have been used to highlight several categories. The commonly occurring native species do not fall into any of these categories.

- (A) Accidental - a species that rarely or accidentally occurs in the Tuamotus
- (E) Endemic - a species endemic to the Tuamotus
- (I) Introduced - a species introduced to the Tuamotus as a consequence, direct or indirect, of human actions

== Ducks, geese, and waterfowl ==
Order: Anseriformes Family: Anatidae

Anatidae includes the ducks and most duck-like waterfowl, such as geese and swans. These birds are adapted to an aquatic existence with webbed feet, flattened bills, and feathers that are excellent at shedding water due to an oily coating.

- Northern shoveler, Spatula clypeata (A)

== Pheasants, grouse, and allies ==
Order: Galliformes Family: Phasianidae

The Phasianidae are a family of terrestrial birds which consists of quails, partridges, snowcocks, francolins, spurfowls, tragopans, monals, pheasants, peafowls and jungle fowls. In general, they are plump (although they vary in size) and have broad, relatively short wings.

- Red junglefowl, Gallus gallus

== Pigeons and doves ==
Order: Columbiformes Family: Columbidae

Pigeons and doves are stout-bodied birds with short necks and short slender bills with a fleshy cere.

- Rock pigeon, Columba livia
- Polynesian ground dove, Gallicolumba erythroptera (E)
- Zebra dove, Geopelia striata (I)
- Makatea fruit-dove, Ptilinopus chalcurus (E)
- Atoll fruit-dove, Ptilinopus coralensis (E)
- Red-moustached fruit-dove, Ptilinopus mercierii - extinct
- Pacific imperial-pigeon, Ducula pacifica
- Polynesian imperial-pigeon, Ducula aurorae

== Cuckoos ==
Order: Cuculiformes Family: Cuculidae

The family Cuculidae includes cuckoos, roadrunners and anis. These birds are of variable size with slender bodies, long tails and strong legs. The Old World cuckoos are brood parasites.

- Long-tailed koel, Eudynamys taitensis

== Rails, gallinules, and coots ==
Order: Gruiformes Family: Rallidae

Rallidae is a large family of small to medium-sized birds which includes the rails, crakes, coots and gallinules. Typically they inhabit dense vegetation in damp environments near lakes, swamps or rivers. In general they are shy and secretive birds, making them difficult to observe. Most species have strong legs and long toes which are well adapted to soft uneven surfaces. They tend to have short, rounded wings and to be weak fliers.

- Tahiti rail, Gallirallus pacificus- (E), extinct
- Spotless crake, Zapornia tabuensis

== Plovers and lapwings ==
Order: Charadriiformes Family: Charadriidae

The family Charadriidae includes the plovers, dotterels and lapwings. They are small to medium-sized birds with compact bodies, short, thick necks and long, usually pointed, wings. They are found in open country worldwide, mostly in habitats near water.

- Pacific golden-plover, Pluvialis fulva
- Masked lapwing, Vanellus miles (A)

== Sandpipers and allies ==
Order: Charadriiformes Family: Scolopacidae

Scolopacidae is a large diverse family of small to medium-sized shorebirds including the sandpipers, curlews, godwits, shanks, tattlers, woodcocks, snipes, dowitchers and phalaropes. The majority of these species eat small invertebrates picked out of the mud or soil. Variation in length of legs and bills enables multiple species to feed in the same habitat, particularly on the coast, without direct competition for food.

- Bristle-thighed curlew, Numenius tahitiensis
- Ruddy turnstone, Arenaria interpres (A)
- Tuamotu sandpiper, Prosobonia parvirostris (E)
- Sanderling, Calidris alba (A)
- Pectoral sandpiper, Calidris melanotos (A)
- Gray-tailed tattler, Tringa brevipes
- Wandering tattler, Tringa incana
- Lesser yellowlegs, Tringa flavipes (A)

== Skuas and jaegers ==
Order: Charadriiformes Family: Stercorariidae

The family Stercorariidae are, in general, medium to large birds, typically with grey or brown plumage, often with white markings on the wings. They nest on the ground in temperate and arctic regions and are long-distance migrants.

- Pomarine jaeger, Stercorarius pomarinus

== Gulls, terns, and skimmers ==
Order: Charadriiformes Family: Laridae

Laridae is a family of medium to large seabirds, the gulls, terns, and skimmers. Gulls are typically grey or white, often with black markings on the head or wings. They have stout, longish bills and webbed feet. Terns are a group of generally medium to large seabirds typically with grey or white plumage, often with black markings on the head. Most terns hunt fish by diving but some pick insects off the surface of fresh water. Terns are generally long-lived birds, with several species known to live in excess of 30 years.

- Brown noddy, Anous stolidus
- Black noddy, Anous minutus
- Blue-gray noddy, Anous cerulea
- White tern, Gygis alba
- Sooty tern, Onychoprion fuscatus
- Gray-backed tern, Onychoprion lunatus
- Bridled tern, Onychoprion anaethetus (A)
- Roseate tern, Sterna dougallii
- Great crested tern, Sterna bergii

== Tropicbirds ==
Order: Phaethontiformes Family: Phaethontidae

Tropicbirds are slender white birds of tropical oceans, with exceptionally long central tail feathers. Their heads and long wings have black markings.

- White-tailed tropicbird, Phaethon lepturus
- Red-billed tropicbird, Phaethon aethereus (A)
- Red-tailed tropicbird, Phaethon rubricauda

== Albatrosses ==
Order: Procellariiformes Family: Diomedeidae

The albatrosses are among the largest of flying birds, and the great albatrosses from the genus Diomedea have the largest wingspans of any extant birds.

- Black-browed albatross, Thalassarche melanophris (A)
- Royal albatross, Diomedea epomophora (A)

== Southern storm-petrels ==
Order: Procellariiformes Family: Oceanitidae

The southern storm-petrels are relatives of the petrels and are the smallest seabirds. They feed on planktonic crustaceans and small fish picked from the surface, typically while hovering. The flight is fluttering and sometimes bat-like.

- White-faced storm-petrel, Pelagodroma marina
- White-bellied storm-petrel, Fregetta grallaria
- Polynesian storm-petrel, Nesofregetta fuliginosa

== Shearwaters and petrels ==
Order: Procellariiformes Family: Procellariidae

The procellariids are the main group of medium-sized "true petrels", characterised by united nostrils with medium septum and a long outer functional primary.

- Southern giant-petrel, Macronectes giganteus (A)
- Kermadec petrel, Pterodroma neglecta
- Herald petrel, Pterodroma arminjoniana
- Murphy's petrel, Pterodroma ultima
- Providence petrel, Pterodroma solandri
- Henderson petrel, Pterodroma atrata
- Mottled petrel, Pterodroma inexpectata
- Juan Fernandez petrel, Pterodroma externa
- White-necked petrel, Pterodroma cervicalis
- Black-winged petrel, Pterodroma nigripennis
- Cook's petrel, Pterodroma cookii
- Gould's petrel, Pterodroma leucoptera
- Collared petrel, Pterodroma brevipes (A)
- Stejneger's petrel, Pterodroma longirostris (A)
- Phoenix petrel, Pterodroma alba - vulnerable
- Blue petrel, Halobaena caerulea
- Bulwer's petrel, Bulweria bulwerii
- Tahiti petrel, Pseudobulweria rostrata
- Gray petrel, Procellaria cinerea - near-threatened
- Wedge-tailed shearwater, Ardenna pacifica
- Buller's shearwater, Ardenna bulleri (A)
- Sooty shearwater, Ardenna grisea
- Short-tailed shearwater, Ardenna tenuirostris (A)
- Christmas shearwater, Puffinus nativitatis
- Tropical shearwater, Puffinus bailloni

== Frigatebirds ==
Order: Suliformes Family: Fregatidae

Frigatebirds are large seabirds usually found over tropical oceans. They are large, black-and-white or completely black, with long wings and deeply forked tails. The males have coloured inflatable throat pouches. They do not swim or walk and cannot take off from a flat surface. Having the largest wingspan-to-body-weight ratio of any bird, they are essentially aerial, able to stay aloft for more than a week.

- Lesser frigatebird, Fregata ariel
- Great frigatebird, Fregata minor

== Boobies and gannets ==
Order: Suliformes Family: Sulidae

The sulids comprise the gannets and boobies. Both groups are medium to large coastal seabirds that plunge-dive for fish.

- Masked booby, Sula dactylatra
- Brown booby, Sula leucogaster
- Red-footed booby, Sula sula

== Herons, egrets, and bitterns ==
Order: Pelecaniformes Family: Ardeidae

The family Ardeidae contains the bitterns, herons, and egrets. Herons and egrets are medium to large wading birds with long necks and legs. Bitterns tend to be shorter necked and more wary. Members of Ardeidae fly with their necks retracted, unlike other long-necked birds such as storks, ibises and spoonbills.

- Pacific reef-heron, Egretta sacra
- Striated heron, Butorides striata

== Kingfishers ==
Order: Coraciiformes Family: Alcedinidae

Kingfishers are medium-sized birds with large heads, long, pointed bills, short legs and stubby tails.

- Niau kingfisher, Todirhamphus gertrudae (E)
- Mangareva kingfisher, Todirhamphus gambieri (E)
- Chattering kingfisher, Todirhamphus tuta

== Old World parrots ==
Order: Psittaciformes Family: Psittaculidae

Characteristic features of parrots include a strong curved bill, an upright stance, strong legs, and clawed zygodactyl feet. Many parrots are vividly colored, and some are multi-colored. In size they range from 8 cm (3.1 in) to 1 m (3.3 ft) in length. Old World parrots are found from Africa east across south and southeast Asia and Oceania to Australia and New Zealand.

- Blue lorikeet, Vini peruviana (E)

== Monarch flycatchers ==
Order: Passeriformes Family: Monarchidae

The monarch flycatchers are small to medium-sized insectivorous passerines which hunt by flycatching.

- Eiao monarch, Pomarea fluxa (E)
- Nuku Hiva monarch, Pomarea nukuhivae (E)
- Iphis monarch, Pomarea iphis (E)
- Marquesas monarch, Pomarea mendozae
- Fatuhiva monarch, Pomarea whitneyi (E)

== Reed warblers and allies ==
Order: Passeriformes Family: Acrocephalidae

The members of this family are usually rather large for "warblers". Most are rather plain olivaceous brown above with much yellow to beige below. They are usually found in open woodland, reedbeds, or tall grass. The family occurs mostly in southern to western Eurasia and surroundings, but it also ranges far into the Pacific, with some species in Africa.

- Tuamotu reed warbler, Acrocephalus atyphus (E)

== White-eyes, yuhinas, and allies ==
Order: Passeriformes Family: Zosteropidae

The white-eyes are small and mostly undistinguished, their plumage above being generally some dull colour like greenish-olive, but some species have a white or bright yellow throat, breast or lower parts, and several have buff flanks. As their name suggests, many species have a white ring around each eye.

- Silvereye, Zosterops lateralis (I)

== Starlings ==
Order: Passeriformes Family: Sturnidae

Starlings are small to medium-sized passerine birds. Their flight is strong and direct and they are very gregarious. Their preferred habitat is fairly open country. They eat insects and fruit. Plumage is typically dark with a metallic sheen.

- Common myna, Acridotheres tristis (I)

== Waxbills and allies ==
Order: Passeriformes Family: Estrildidae

The estrildid finches are small passerine birds of the Old World tropics and Australasia. They are gregarious and often colonial seed eaters with short thick but pointed bills. They are all similar in structure and habits, but have wide variation in plumage colours and patterns.

- Red-browed firetail, Neochmia temporalis (I)

== See also ==
- Lists of birds by region
