= Astolfo (disambiguation) =

Astolfo is a fictional character of the Matter of France where he is one of Charlemagne's paladins.

Astolfo may also refer to:

== People ==
- Astolfo Petrazzi (1583–c. 1653), Italian Baroque painter
- Astolfo Romero (1950–2000), Venezuelan composer and musician
- Astolfo Romero (footballer) (born 1957), Colombian footballer
- Federica D'Astolfo (born 1966), Italian footballer
- Astolfo Cejundo and Astolfo Félix, injured in the 1984 San Ysidro McDonald's massacre
- Astolfo Gomes de Mello Araujo, winner of the 2008 Ig Nobel Prize in archaeology

== Fiction ==
- Astolfo, in the Italian epic poem Orlando Furioso, as well as the operas based on it
- Astolfo, in the opera 1735 Alcina by George Frideric Handel
- Astolfo, in the 1636 Spanish play Life Is a Dream (La vida es sueño)
- Astolfo, in the 1960 Italian film Terror of the Red Mask
- Count Astolfo, in the 1962 Italian film The Prisoner of the Iron Mask
- Astolfo, in the 1985 Italian film Woman of Wonders (La donna delle meraviglie)
- Astolfo Granatum, in the 2015 Japanese manga series The Case Study of Vanitas
- Astolfo, a character in the light novel series Fate/Apocrypha
- Astolfo, a playable character in Fire Emblem: The Binding Blade
- Never Too Late for Love or Astolfo, a 2022 Italian-French comedy film

== Places ==
- Astolfo Dutra, a municipality in Brazil

== See also ==
- Astolf (disambiguation)
- Aistulf, King of the Lombards
- Luigi Astolfi
