= Ornithological Society of Polynesia =

Environmental organization

Coordinates: 17.7527°S 149.3182°W

- Société d'Ornithologie de Polynésie
- Nickname: Manu
- Formation: July 1990
- Founded at: French Polynesia
- Type: NGO
- Purpose: Conservation
- Region served: Polynesia
- Publication: Te Manu
- Affiliations: BirdLife International; Auckland Zoo
- Website: manu.pf/E_Lasop.html

The Ornithological Society of Polynesia (French: Société d'Ornithologie de Polynésie), also known as Manu, a Polynesian word for "bird", is an environmental non-governmental organization dedicated to the conservation of birds and their habitats in Polynesia. It was founded in July 1990 by bird enthusiasts in French Polynesia, for which it is the BirdLife International partner organisation. Its emblem is the red-tailed tropicbird.

== Activities ==
The Society publishes the quarterly French language bulletin Te Manu, which is sent to all members. It is involved in surveys and conservation programs regarding the critically endangered Polynesian ground dove, Marquesan imperial pigeon, Tuamotu kingfisher, Tahiti monarch, Fatu Hiva monarch; the endangered Phoenix petrel, Tuamotu sandpiper, Marquesan ground dove, Polynesian imperial pigeon, Rimatara lorikeet, ultramarine lorikeet, Marquesan kingfisher, Marquesan monarch, as well as the blue lorikeet and Tahiti petrel.

In July 2023 the society announced a joint program with Auckland Zoo to save the Fatu Hiva monarch from extinction. Eggs will be collected for incubation and hatching, and fledglings raised in a predator-proof aviary.

In December 2023 the society was awarded XPF327 million from the French green fund to fund its "Stop Extinction" program. In February 2024 the society reintroduced the Tahitian Striated heron to Huahine.

== See also ==
- Caroline Blanvillain
- Pacific Islands Conservation Research Association
