= Caroline Blanvillain =

French researcher

Caroline Blanvillain (born 1966) is a French veterinarian and conservationist who works in French Polynesia for the Ornithological Society of Polynesia.

Blanvillain was born in Paris. She studied veterinary science at the École nationale vétérinaire d'Alfort, completing a thesis on Contribution à la compréhension de la stratégie de reproduction de l'oryx d'Arabie (Oryx leucoryx) face aux conditions désertiques : application à la conservation de l'espèce. After working in zoos and the Museum of Natural History, she moved to French Polynesia in 1997. She worked on saving the Tahiti monarch and Ultramarine lorikeet.

In 2019 she was nominated for the Indianapolis Prize. She was nominated again in 2022.

In 2022 she published a guide to the birds of French Polynesia.
