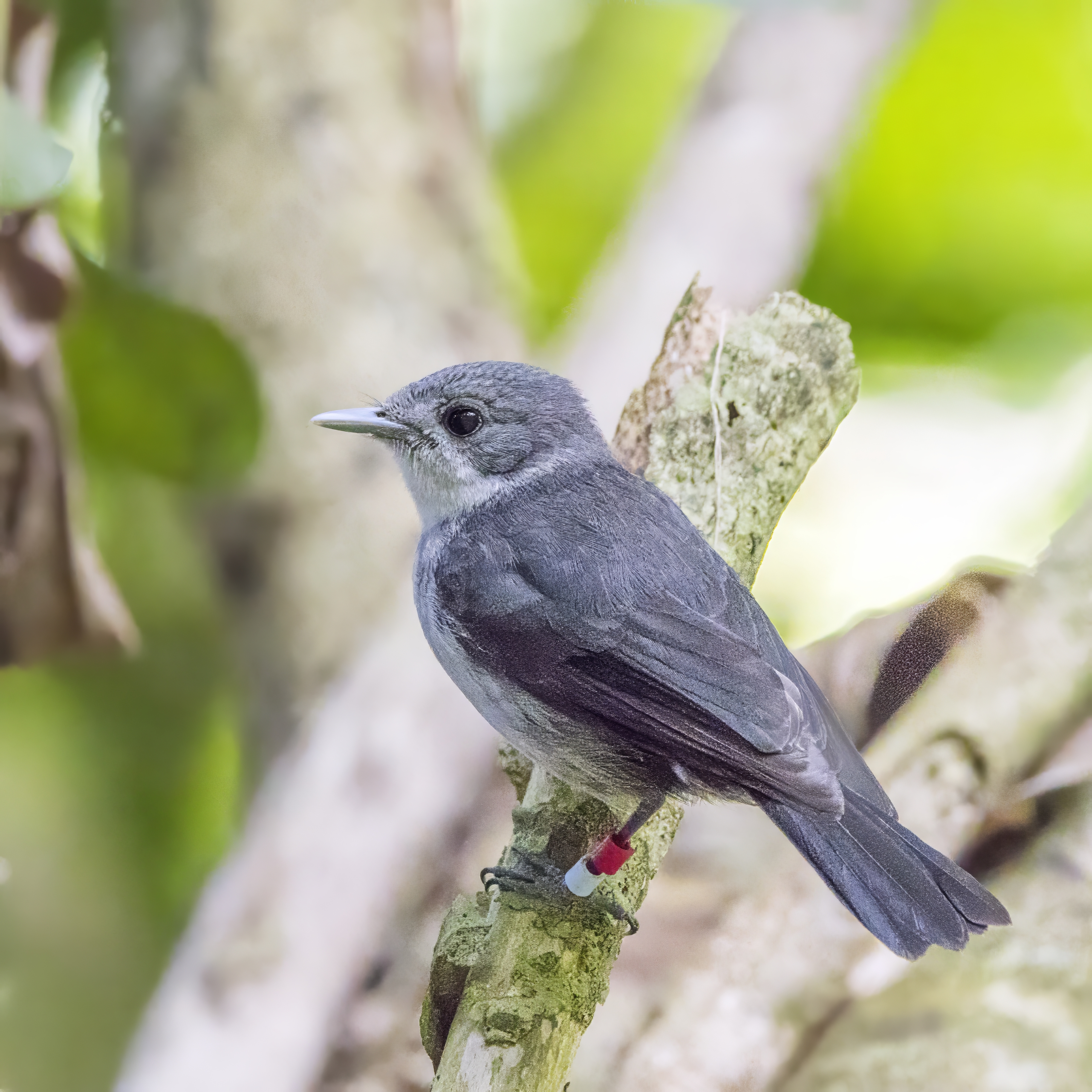
- Adult
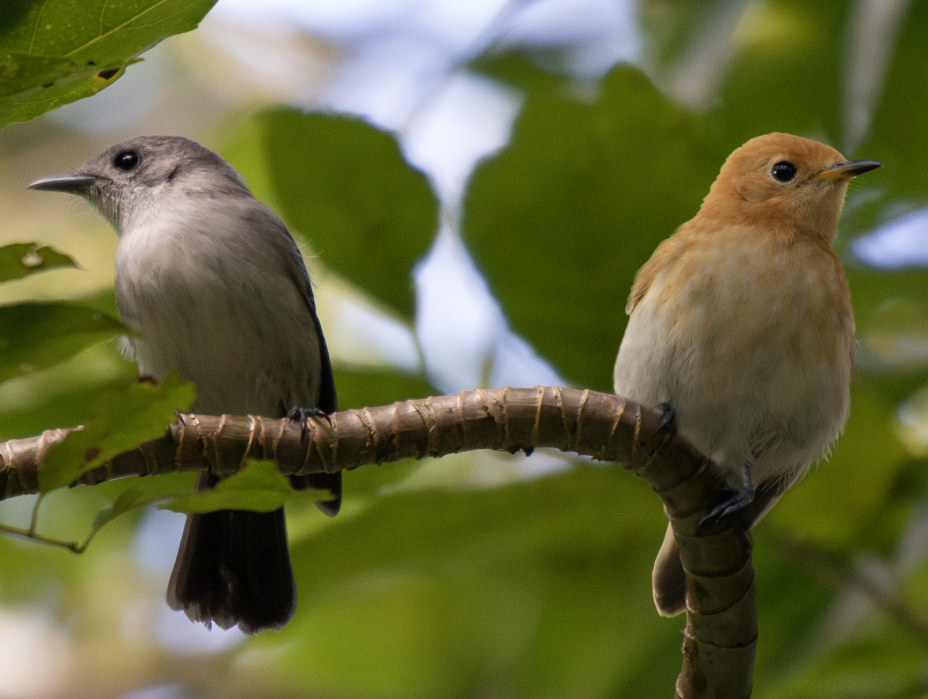
- Left: at least 4 years old. Right: under 1 year old

Conservation status
- Vulnerable (IUCN 3.1)

Scientific classification
- Kingdom: Animalia
- Phylum: Chordata
- Class: Aves
- Order: Passeriformes
- Family: Monarchidae
- Genus: Pomarea
- Species: P. dimidiata

Binomial name
- Pomarea dimidiata (Hartlaub & Finsch, 1871)
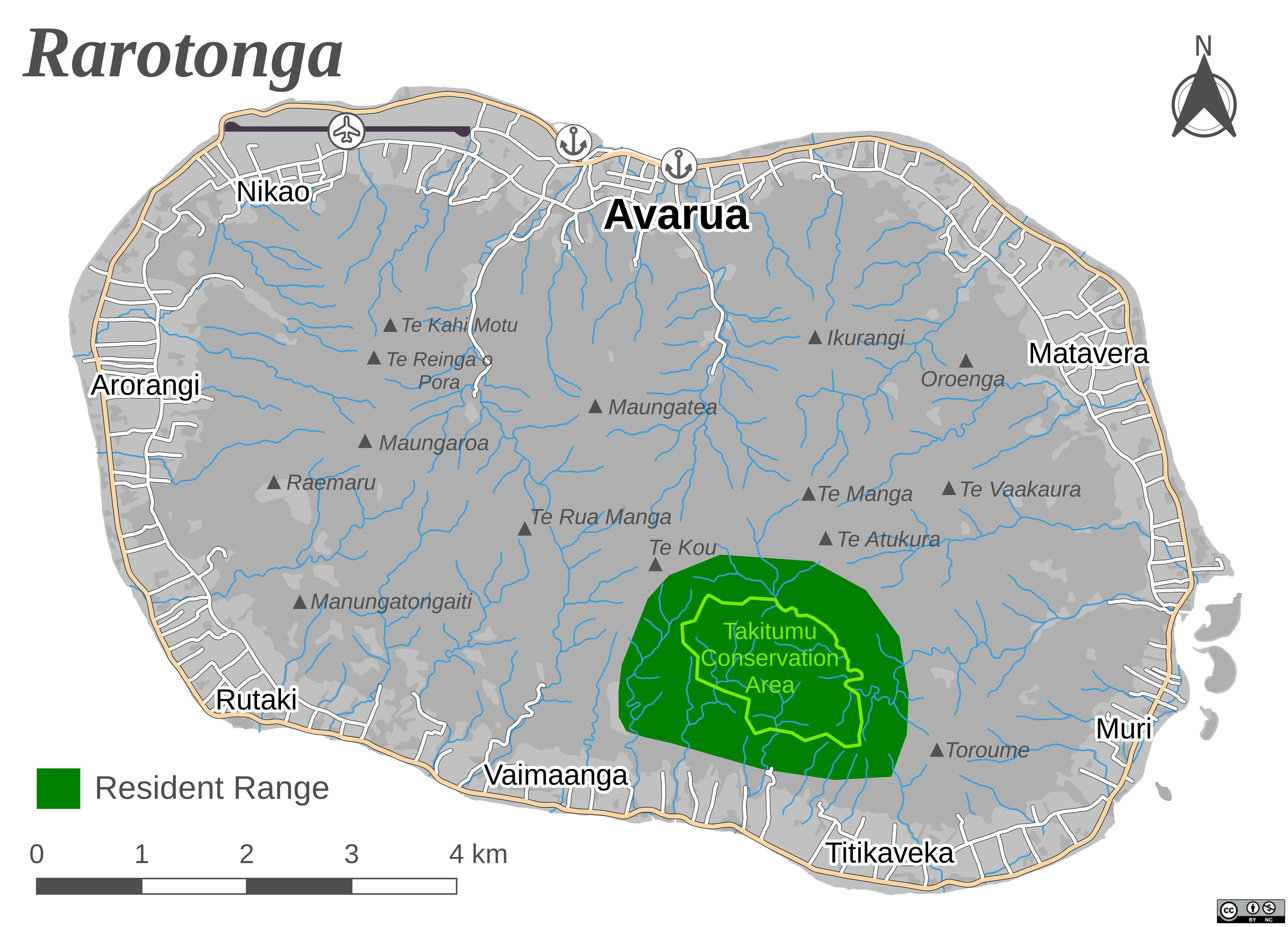
- The resident range within Rarotonga. An introduced range also exists on Atiu island. Resident range Introduced range
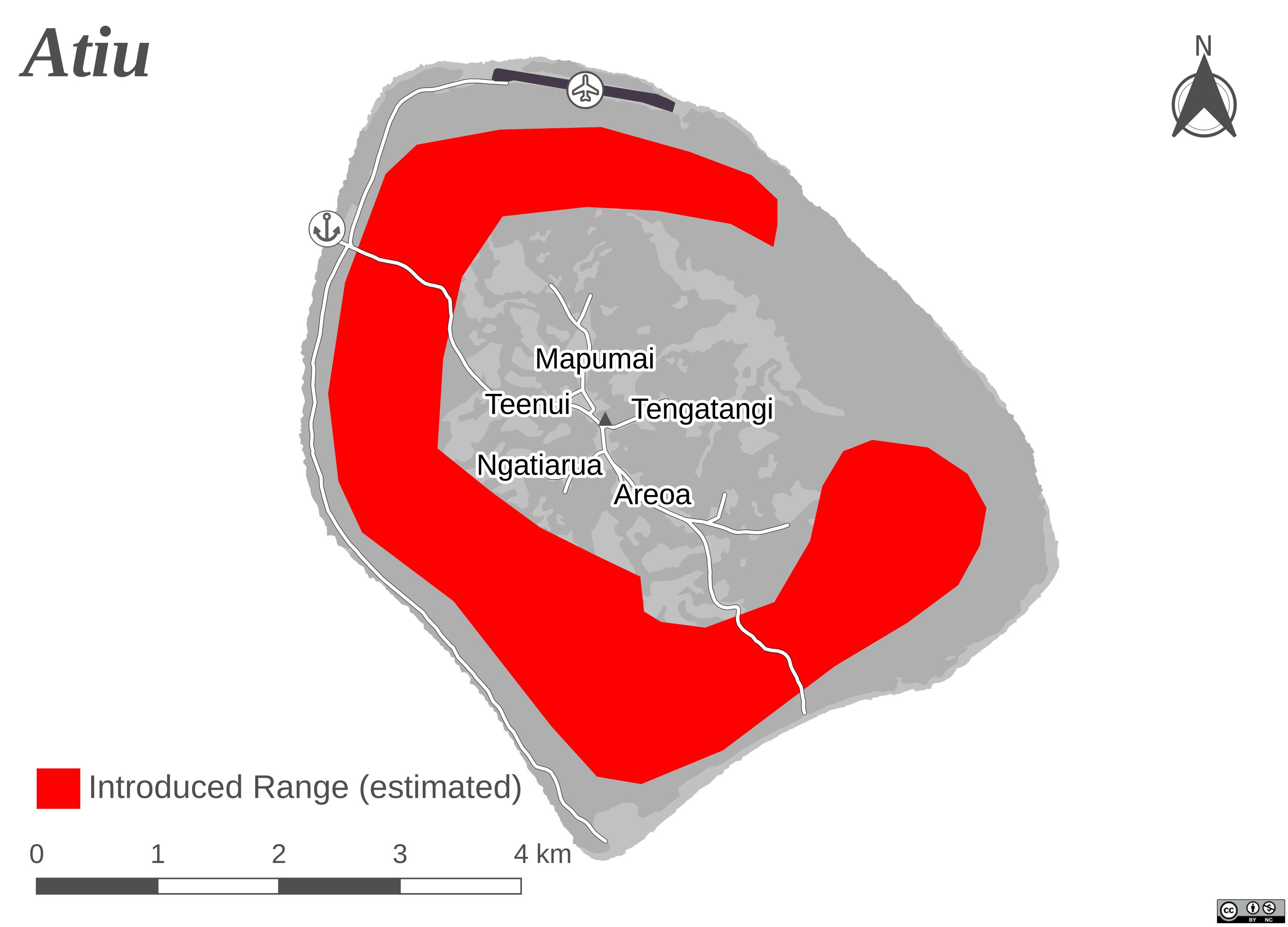

Synonyms
- Monarches dimidiatus

= Rarotonga monarch =

Species of bird

The Rarotonga monarch (Pomarea dimidiata), also known as the Rarotonga flycatcher or kākerōri, is a species of bird in the monarch flycatcher family Monarchidae. It is endemic to Rarotonga in the Cook Islands, and has been introduced to Atiu, also in the Cook Islands.

== Taxonomy and systematics ==
The Rarotonga monarch was originally described in the genus Monarcha. Alternate names include Cook Island flycatcher, Cook Islands monarch, kakerori, and Rarotonga monarch-flycatcher.

== Description ==
The Rarotonga monarch is an insectivorous passerine which is 10 cm tall, with an adult mass of 20 grams (0.7 oz) for female birds, and 25 grams (0.9 oz) for large male birds. Hunting mainly consists of foraging for insects within foliage, and occasionally taking insects during flight.

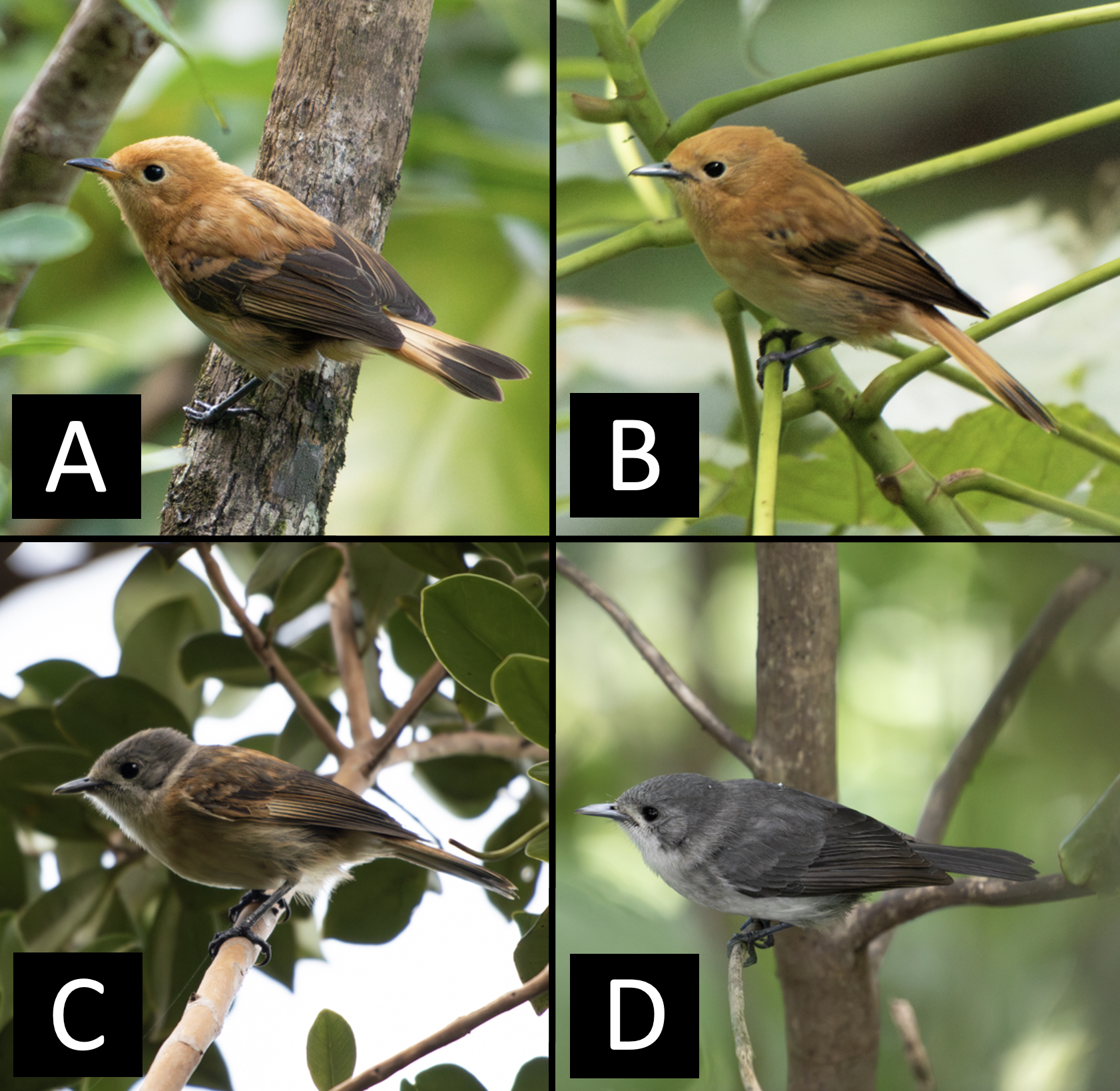
A: Orange with yellow in the beak the near head, correlates to less than a year old. B: Orange with Blue/Black beak, correlates to an age of two years. C: Mixed plumage, with orange wing feathers still present, but with some grey plumage, correlating to about three years old. D: Grey plumage, correlates with an age of four years and older. This is the final plumage stage for the remainder of the bird's lifespan.

The Rarotonga monarch is unusual as its plumage and beak undergoes a sequential colour change as the bird matures. The initial plumage of orange changes to orange-grey mixed, then finally grey when maturity is reached, after four years. Initially, the grey and orange birds were attributed to different species. Later, it was thought that grey plumage birds were male, while the orange birds were females or juveniles of the same species, but this was corrected to being age-based plumage in 1983. Another bird in the Pomarea genus, the Fatu Hiva monarch, also undergoes a sequential colour change as it ages.

== Behaviour and ecology ==
Owing to its tropical oceanic island location, the Rarotonga monarch is exceptionally long-lived, with an adult survival of between 85 and 89 percent, a life expectancy of seven to nine years, and a maximum known lifespan of around 24 years and 8 months. These figures are comparable to large Australian passerines like the superb lyrebird or satin bowerbird and more than ten times the life expectancies of similar sized Holarctic songbirds.

=== Breeding ===
The extraordinary longevity of these birds may explain the evolution of helpers at the nest, a feature otherwise completely absent from the Monarchidae family. Males can breed at one year, but do not do so in practice until they are four years old. Breeding season is between October and February, but most eggs are laid between October and early November. Nests are mossy deep cups which are built in the fork of a tree branch, often constructed above creeks, and take about 7 days to build. Incubation last 13–14 days. Clutches are 1–2 eggs. In Rarotonga, many nest failures are attributed to predation by black rats or kiore, as birds sit on the nest.

=== Threats ===
Since the introduction of the black rat and feral cat, adult mortality has more than doubled, a change sufficient to reduce what was previously a very numerous bird to one of the most endangered birds in the world by the middle 1980s, when the Rarotonga monarch was listed as one of the highest conservation priorities among all Pacific Island birds. The annual pre-breeding removal of rats (starting in the late 1980s) from its principal breeding area on the south coast of Rarotonga (at the Takitumu Conservation Area) by staff and volunteers has made breeding significantly more successful: around two thirds of pairs assisted by a few helpers can now rear the normal clutch of two eggs, whereas in the 1980s breeding attempts had a success rate as low as eleven percent. Despite the growth in population, a major tropical cyclone could destroy this population growth with extreme swiftness, so that conservation work is still very important.

== Status ==
In the 1989, the total population was estimated at fewer than 29 birds in the wild, and was critically endangered but has recovered since annual rat bait laying during the breeding season. The Rarotonga monarch was limited to Rarotonga until a second population was established on Atiu Island⁣ by translocating 30 young birds in 2001, to establish an 'insurance population', should the Rarotongan bird population suffer a catastrophe.

In 2022 the total species population was assessed at 500 mature birds, and is now regarded as vulnerable. This reversal in conservation status is regarded as a major success story for South Pacific bird conservation efforts, with the Takitumu Conservation Area project receiving a Conversation Award by Birdlife International in 2022.
