= Large flycatcher =

Large flycatcher may refer to:

- Fatu Hiva monarch, a species of flycatcher found in French Polynesia
- African grey flycatcher, a species of flycatcher found in East Africa
