= Astolf =

Astolf or Astolph can refer to:

- Aistulf, the Duke of Friuli from 744, King of the Lombards from 749, and Duke of Spoleto from 751
- Astolfo, a fictional character of the Matter of France where he is one of Charlemagne's paladins
