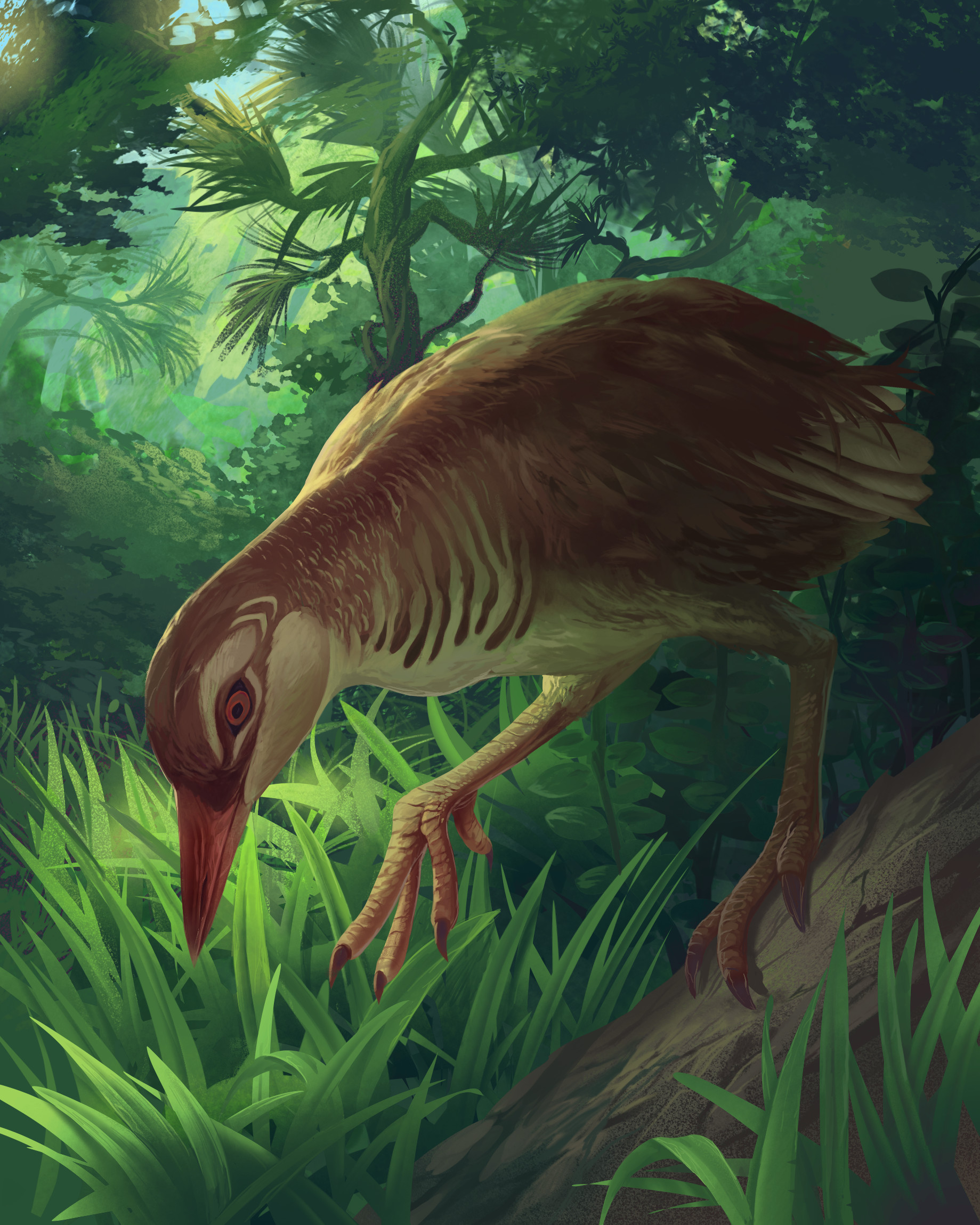
- Artistic reconstruction of Astolfo's rail, Gallirallus astolfoi, 2022 by Simone Giovanardi.

Conservation status
- Extinct

Scientific classification
- Kingdom: Animalia
- Phylum: Chordata
- Class: Aves
- Order: Gruiformes
- Family: Rallidae
- Genus: Gallirallus
- Species: †G. astolfoi

Binomial name
- †Gallirallus astolfoi Salvador, Anderson & Tennyson, 2021

= Astolfo's rail =

Astolfo's rail Temporal range: Late Holocene

Extinct species of bird

Astolfo's rail (Gallirallus astolfoi) is an extinct species of flightless bird in the Rallidae, or rail family. It lived in Rapa Iti, one of the Bass Islands in French Polynesia.

== History ==
This rail species was described in 2021 from a subfossil bone collected in 2002 by Atholl Anderson at the Tangarutu Cave site on the island of Rapa Iti in French Polynesia. Occupation of the cave likely dates back to between 1400 and 1600 CE. The species likely became extinct after human settlement on Rapa Iti, however there is little evidence that early human settlers ate small rails like the Astolfo's rail, as char marks were missing on the bones of rail skeletons. Despite the current lack of evidence, human predation is a proposed theory for the extinction of the Astolfo's rail. The species is believed to be either flightless or having reduced flight capacity, similar to other avians of the Rallidae family.

== Etymology ==
The specific epithet honors the fictional character Astolfo, who is one of Charlemagne's paladins in the Matter of France. In the epic Orlando Furioso, by Ludovico Ariosto, Astolfo becomes trapped on a remote island because of the sorceress Alcina.

== See also ==
- List of birds of French Polynesia
- List of bird species described in the 2020s
