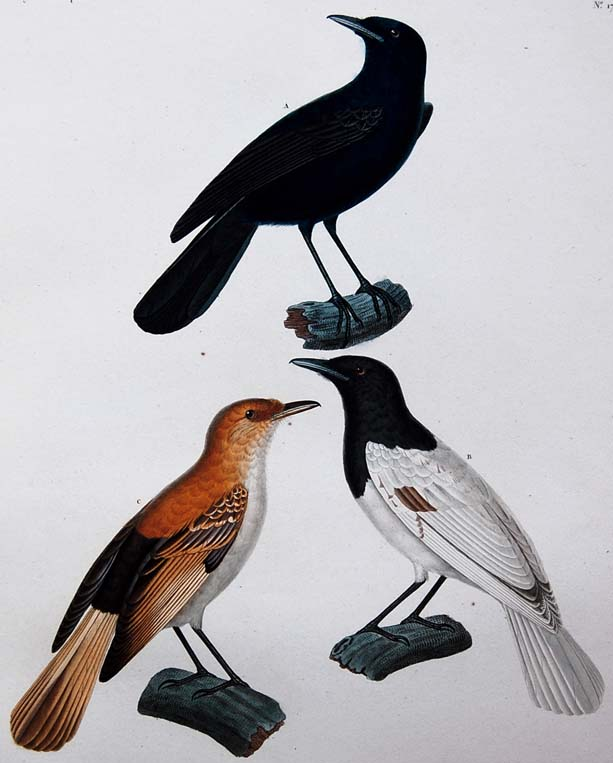

Scientific classification
- Kingdom: Animalia
- Phylum: Chordata
- Class: Aves
- Order: Passeriformes
- Family: Monarchidae
- Genus: Pomarea; Bonaparte, 1854

Type species
- Muscicapa nigra Sparrman, 1786

= Pomarea =

Genus of birds

Pomarea is a genus of birds in the monarch flycatcher family Monarchidae. The genus is restricted to the islands of Polynesia. The monarchs of this genus are around 15–19 cm long and most have sexually dimorphic plumage.

== Taxonomy ==
The genus Pomarea was introduced in 1854 by the French naturalist Charles Lucien Bonaparte with Muscicapa nigra Sparrman, the Tahiti monarch, as the type species. The genius name honors the Pōmare dynasty, which was the ruling family of the Kingdom of Tahiti from 1788 until the cession to France in 1880.

The genus contains nine species, of which three are extinct and one is possibly extinct:

Image	Common name	Scientific name	Distribution
	Tahiti monarch	Pomarea nigra	Highlands of Tahiti (Society Islands).
	Rarotonga monarch	Pomarea dimidiata	Forest undergrowth of Rarotonga (southwestern Cook Islands).
	Iphis monarch	Pomarea iphis	Ua Huka (northern Marquesas Islands).
	Marquesan monarch	Pomarea mendozae	Central Marquesas Islands.
	Fatu Hiva monarch	Pomarea whitneyi	Fatu Hiva (southern Marquesas Islands).
	Ua Pou monarch	Pomarea mira	Marquesas Islands (Ua Pou); critically endangered, if not extinct.
	† Maupiti monarch	Pomarea maupitiensis	Formerly highlands of Maupiti Island (Society Islands); extinct.
	† Eiao monarch	Pomarea fluxa	Formerly Eiao (northern Marquesas Islands); extinct.
	† Nuku Hiva monarch	Pomarea nukuhivae	Formerly Marquesas Islands (Nuku Hiva); extinct, last reported in the 1930s.

=== Former species ===
Formerly, some authorities also considered the following species (or subspecies) as species within the genus Pomarea:

- Bougainville monarch (as Pomarea erythrosticta)
- Chestnut-bellied monarch (ugiensis) (as Pomarea ugiensis)

== Status ==
The genus is highly threatened, with three of the six remaining species listed as critically endangered, one endangered and two vulnerable. Three species have already become extinct. The principal threat to all these species is predation by the introduced black rat.
