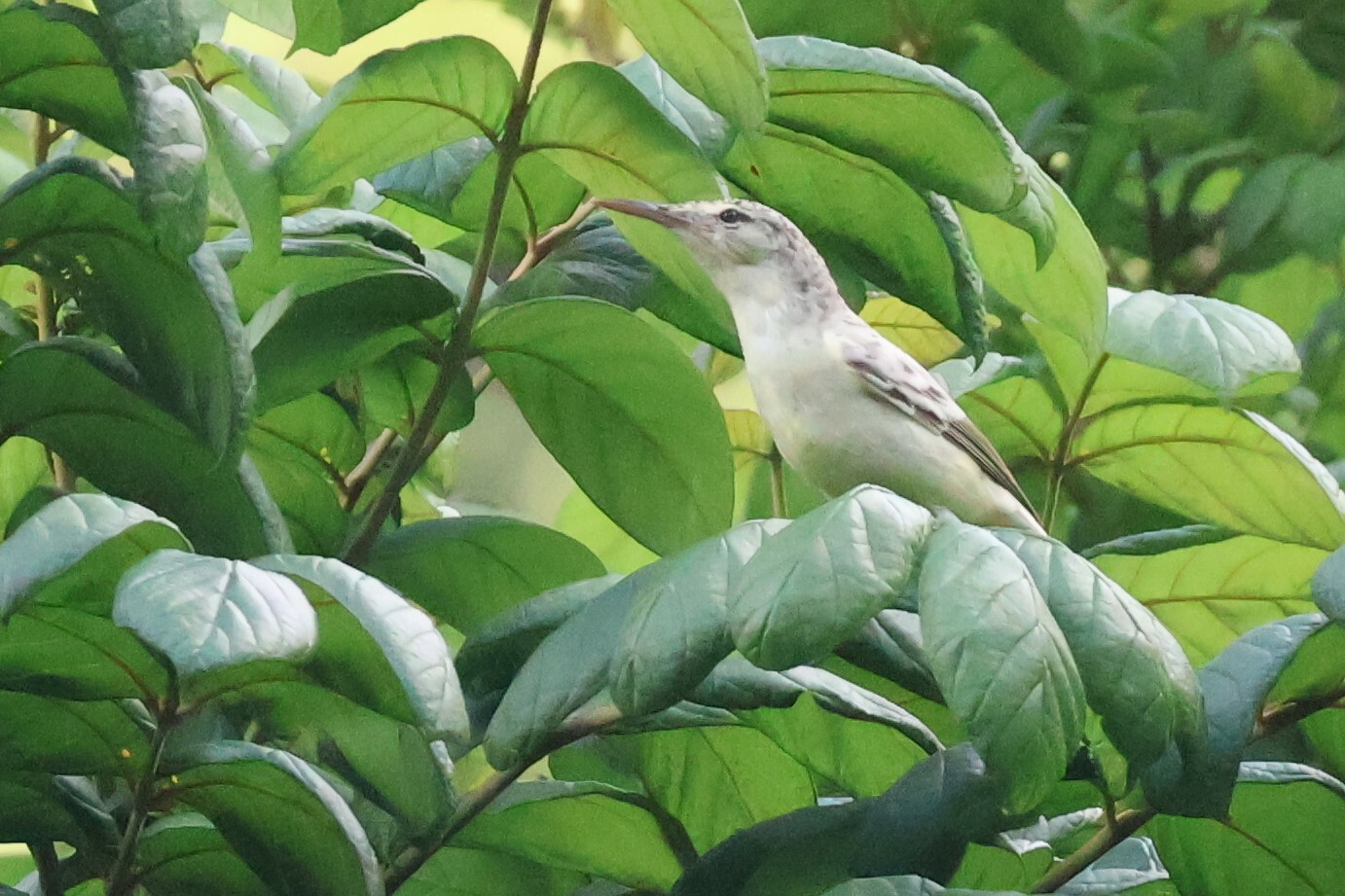

Conservation status
- Vulnerable (IUCN 3.1)

Scientific classification
- Kingdom: Animalia
- Phylum: Chordata
- Class: Aves
- Order: Passeriformes
- Family: Acrocephalidae
- Genus: Acrocephalus
- Species: A. caffer

Binomial name
- Acrocephalus caffer (Sparrman, 1786)
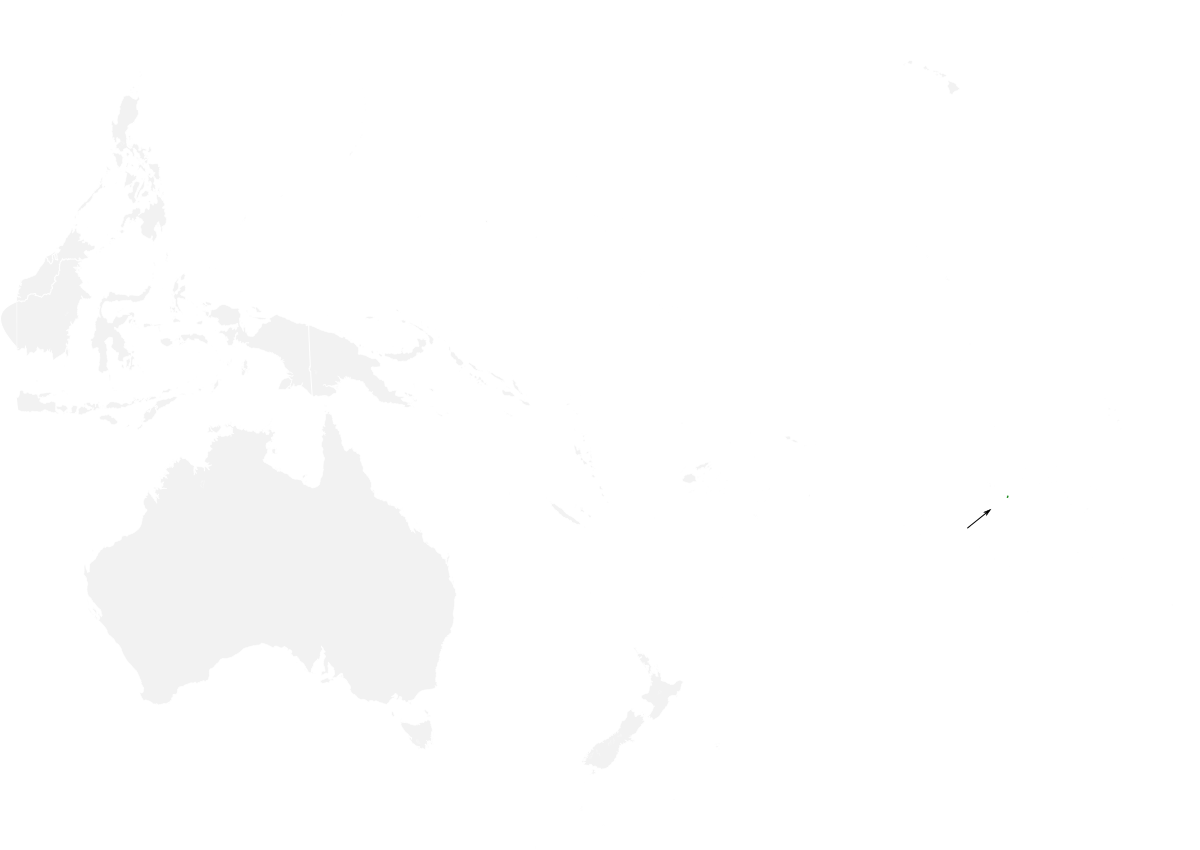

= Tahiti reed warbler =

Species of bird

The Tahiti reed warbler (Acrocephalus caffer) is a songbird in the genus Acrocephalus. It used to be placed in the "Old World warbler" assemblage (Sylviidae), but is now in the newly recognized marsh warbler family Acrocephalidae. It is endemic to the island of Tahiti.

Most taxonomists regard Garrett's reed warbler and the Moorea reed warbler as distinct. They used to be considered subspecies.

As a whole, the Tahiti reed warbler is classified as a vulnerable species by the IUCN.
