= Astolfo Romero =

- Born: Astolfo José Romero Chacín; February 8, 1950; Maracaibo, Venezuela
- Died: May 20, 2000 (aged 50)
- Education: La Universidad de la Gaita
- Occupations: Folkloric musician, composer
- Formerly of: Cardenales del Éxito; La Parranda Gaitera
- Awards: Virgilio Carruyo; Una Gaita Para el Zulia

Astolfo José Romero Chacín (February 8, 1950 – May 20, 2000), also known as "Astolfo Romero" and "El Parroquiano", was a Venezuelan folkloric musician and composer. His work was mainly in the folk genre known as gaita zuliana. His compositions are some of the most recognized within the genre.

== Early life ==
Astolfo Romero was born on February 8, 1950, in the neighborhood of "El Empedrao" in Maracaibo, Venezuela. He was considered to be a child prodigy, playing several Zulia music instruments including: furro, drums, maracas and charrasca. In 1962, at the age of 12, he joined a child piper group called “Los Invasores”. By then he had already composed a piece ("Zulia") which was featured on the regional television channel.

== Career ==
In 1964 he moved to Mérida where he founded the groups “Los Bomberos”, a name inspired by the profession that played at that time, and then “Los Canarios”. In 1968 he returned to Maracaibo and formed a group called “Estampas Gaiteras” with whom he recorded the song “Los Parranderos”.

In 1971 Romero was invited to join the group "Santanita", which already included recognised figures in the genre, including Gladys Vera, Cheo Beceira and Danelo Badell. In 1974 he joined one of the most prestigious groups in gaita zuliana, “Cardenales del Éxito”, where he remained until 1979. During this time he composed his best known pieces, "La Negra Cumba Cumba" and "Barlovento".

In 1980 he attended “La Universidad de la Gaita”. In 1983 he became musical director of “Gaiteros de Pillopo”, which led to him becoming known throughout Venezuela. He recorded some of his best known and remembered compositions with them, including “Entre Palos y Alegrías”, “Una Florecita”, “El Burro” and “La Comae”.

In 1992 he founded "La Parranda Gaitera" with the musicians Pedro Villalobos and Daniel Méndez; the group also achieved success as "La Flor de la Habana". A the same time Romero was working as a composer and arranger for other pipers sets.

== Later life ==
Romero was founding director of the joint "Maragaita" and "Stars of 2000". His last recording (“Tu Ave Cantora” with the group “Los Chiquinquireños”), is a prayer to the Virgin of Chiquinquirá. The piece was originally composed to be sung by Betulio Medina, but a demo was recorded by Romero moments before his death. The recording quality was good enough to allow the recording to be edited to keep his original voice recording.

Throughout his career, Romero was awarded with several awards such as the “Virgilio Carruyo” and “Una Gaita Para el Zulia”, in its first edition. In 1999 he was awarded as soloist of the year. He was also host of the radio program La Gaita Antañona broadcast by the Zulia station 102.1 FM.
