= Astolfo Romero (footballer) =

Colombian footballer (born 1957)

Personal information
- Date of birth: 15 December 1957 (age 68)
- Place of birth: Buenaventura, Colombia

International career
Years	Team	Apps	(Gls)
- Colombia

Astolfo Romero (born 15 December 1957) is a Colombian footballer. He competed in the men's tournament at the 1980 Summer Olympics.
