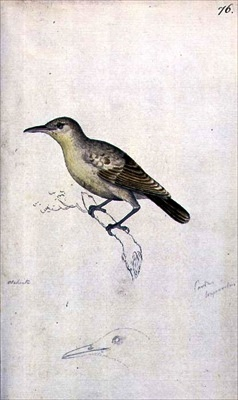
- Painting by William Ellis

Conservation status
- Critically Endangered (IUCN 3.1)

Scientific classification
- Kingdom: Animalia
- Phylum: Chordata
- Class: Aves
- Order: Passeriformes
- Family: Acrocephalidae
- Genus: Acrocephalus
- Species: A. longirostris

Binomial name
- Acrocephalus longirostris (J.F. Gmelin, 1789)

Synonyms
- Turdus longirostris (protonym)

= Moorea reed warbler =

Species of songbird

Moorea reed warbler (Acrocephalus longirostris) is a species of songbird in the genus Acrocephalus. Formerly placed in the "Old World warbler" assemblage (Sylviidae), it is now in the newly recognized marsh warbler family Acrocephalidae. It was once considered a subspecies of the Tahiti reed warbler.

== Distribution and habitat ==
It is endemic to Moorea in the Society Islands. It occurs in second-growth forest as well as Polynesian 'ohe thickets (and likely breeds exclusively in the latter) in river valleys and hillsides.

== Description ==
It has two color morphs; a light morph that is pale yellow with mottled brownish above, and an olive-brown dark morph.

== Conservation ==
It was last seen in 1987, and was previously feared to have gone extinct due to habitat destruction by hydroelectric power, road-building, and exploitation of bamboo, as well as the introduction of the invasive species such as the miconia tree, the common myna, and the feral cat. However, two unconfirmed sightings in the 21st century indicate that it may possibly survive in very low numbers. A 2018 study recommended downlisting the species from Critically Endangered or possibly extinct to just Critically Endangered.
