= Ua Pou monarch =

Conservation status
- Critically endangered, possibly extinct (IUCN 3.1)

Scientific classification
- Kingdom: Animalia
- Phylum: Chordata
- Class: Aves
- Order: Passeriformes
- Family: Monarchidae
- Genus: Pomarea
- Species: P. mira

Binomial name
- Pomarea mira Murphy & Mathews, 1928

Synonyms
- Pomarea mendozae mira

Species of bird

The Ua Pou monarch (Pomarea mira) is a species of bird in the family Monarchidae, endemic to the French Polynesian island of Ua Pou. Its natural habitats are subtropical or tropical moist lowland forest, subtropical or tropical moist montane forest, and heavily degraded former forest.

== Taxonomy and systematics ==
The Ua Pou monarch was formerly considered as a subspecies of the Marquesan monarch until elevated to species rank by the IOC in 2012.

== Status ==
It was considered extinct due to habitat loss, having last been observed in 1975 and not located on intensive searches in 1998 and 1999. However, in 2010 an unconfirmed but convincing report of a male was observed on Ua Pou and based on this possible rediscovery, the status was reverted in 2013 to critically endangered and possibly extinct. If indeed still extant, the remaining population would be very small, certainly less than fifty.
