= Pacific Islands Conservation Research Association =

The Pacific Islands Conservation Research Association logo.

The Pacific Islands Conservation Research Association (PICRA) is a U.S. federally recognized 501(c)3 nonprofit organization. PICRA has a mission of advancing knowledge about insular Pacific species, populations, and ecosystems through unbiased scientific investigations. Research focuses on improving knowledge about islands and the conservation issues that insular fauna face. Results from PICRA’s work are intended for use in the development of applied and theoretical solutions to conservation problems.

PICRA was formed when several conservation biologists and scientists felt that Pacific island conservation issues could benefit greatly from additional research. PICRA scientists have addressed basic biological research documenting the distribution, behavior, interactions, and population dynamics of species in Pacific Oceania. Additional focus has been placed on studying multi-species interactions and the evolution of islands species.

Recent PICRA projects addressed endangered species in the central and south Pacific basins. PICRA supported projects studying coral reef fish and endangered Micronesian Kingfishers (Todiramphus cinnamominus) in the Federated States of Micronesia.

== See also ==
- Biodiversity
- Ecology
- Natural environment
