= Eiao monarch =

Conservation status
- Extinct (IUCN 3.1)

Scientific classification
- Kingdom: Animalia
- Phylum: Chordata
- Class: Aves
- Order: Passeriformes
- Family: Monarchidae
- Genus: Pomarea
- Species: †P. fluxa

Binomial name
- †Pomarea fluxa Murphy & Mathews, 1928

Synonyms
- Pomarea iphis fluxa

Extinct species of bird

The Eiao monarch (Pomarea fluxa) is an extinct species of bird in the family Monarchidae. The species is sometimes considered to have been conspecific with the Iphis monarch. It was endemic to French Polynesia. Its natural habitats were subtropical or tropical dry forests, subtropical or tropical moist lowland forests, and subtropical or tropical moist shrubland.

The Eiao Monarch was last seen in 1977. The likely cause of extinction is thought to have been introduced predators (feral cats, black rats) however, other contributing factors may have included possible avian disease from introduced species (Chestnut-breasted Mannikin) and habitat loss caused by intensive grazing by introduced sheep.

== Taxonomy and systematics ==
Until 2012, the Eiao monarch was considered to be a subspecies (Pomarea iphis fluxa) of the Iphis monarch.
