= Astolfo =

Fictional character in the Matter of France

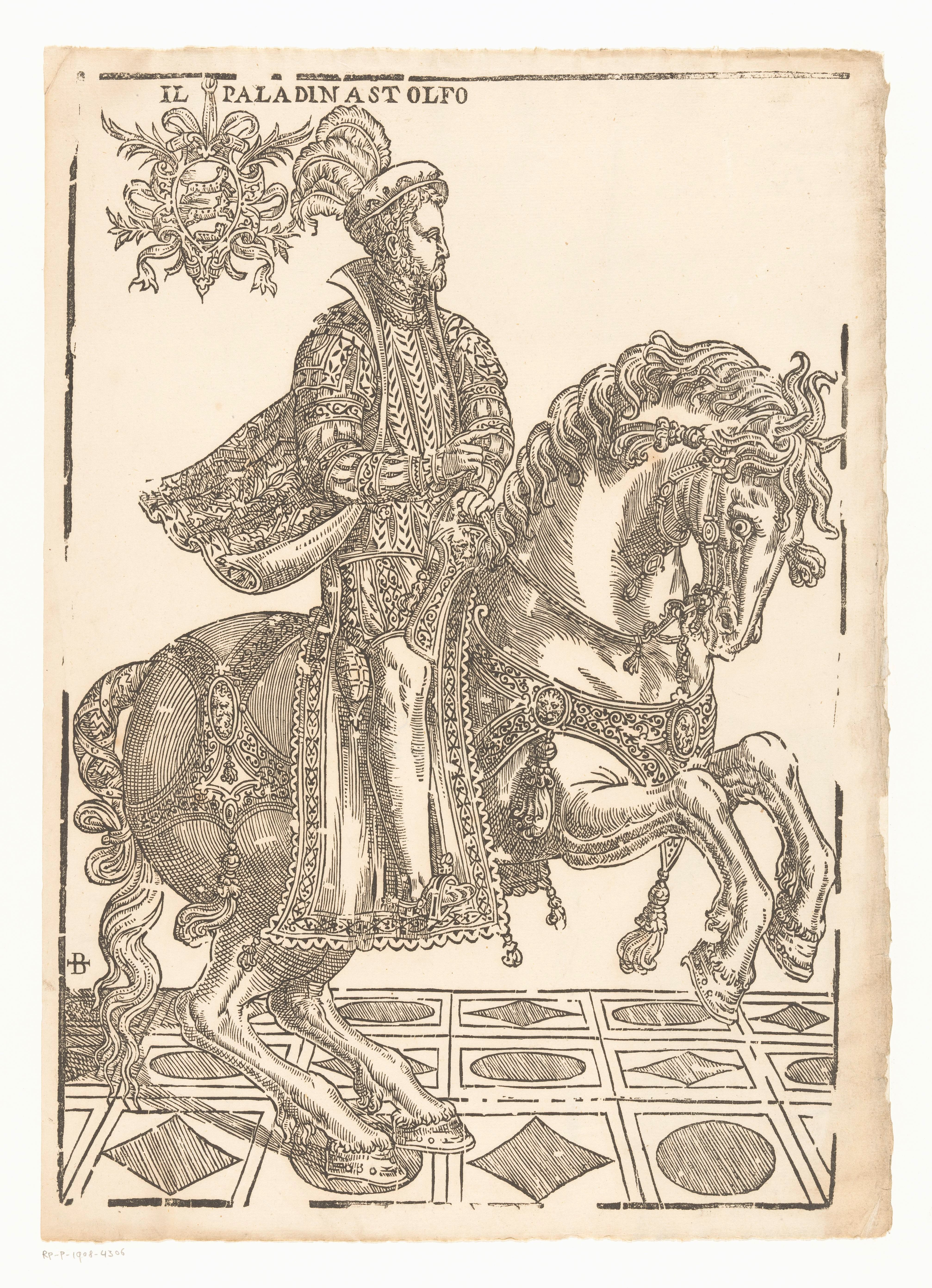
A print depicting Astolfo on horseback, c. 1510–1550

Astolfo (also Astolpho, Estous, and Estouls) is a fictional character in the Matter of France where he is one of Charlemagne's paladins. He is the son of Otto, the King of England (possibly referring to Charles' contemporary Offa of Mercia), and is a cousin to Orlando and Rinaldo, and a descendant of Charles Martel. While Astolfo's name appeared in the Old French chanson de geste The Four Sons of Aymon, his first major appearance was in the anonymous early fourteenth-century Franco-Italian epic poem La Prise de Pampelune. He was subsequently a major character (typically humorous) in Italian Renaissance romance epics, such as Morgante by Luigi Pulci, Orlando Innamorato by Matteo Maria Boiardo, and Orlando Furioso by Ludovico Ariosto.

== In Orlando Furioso ==
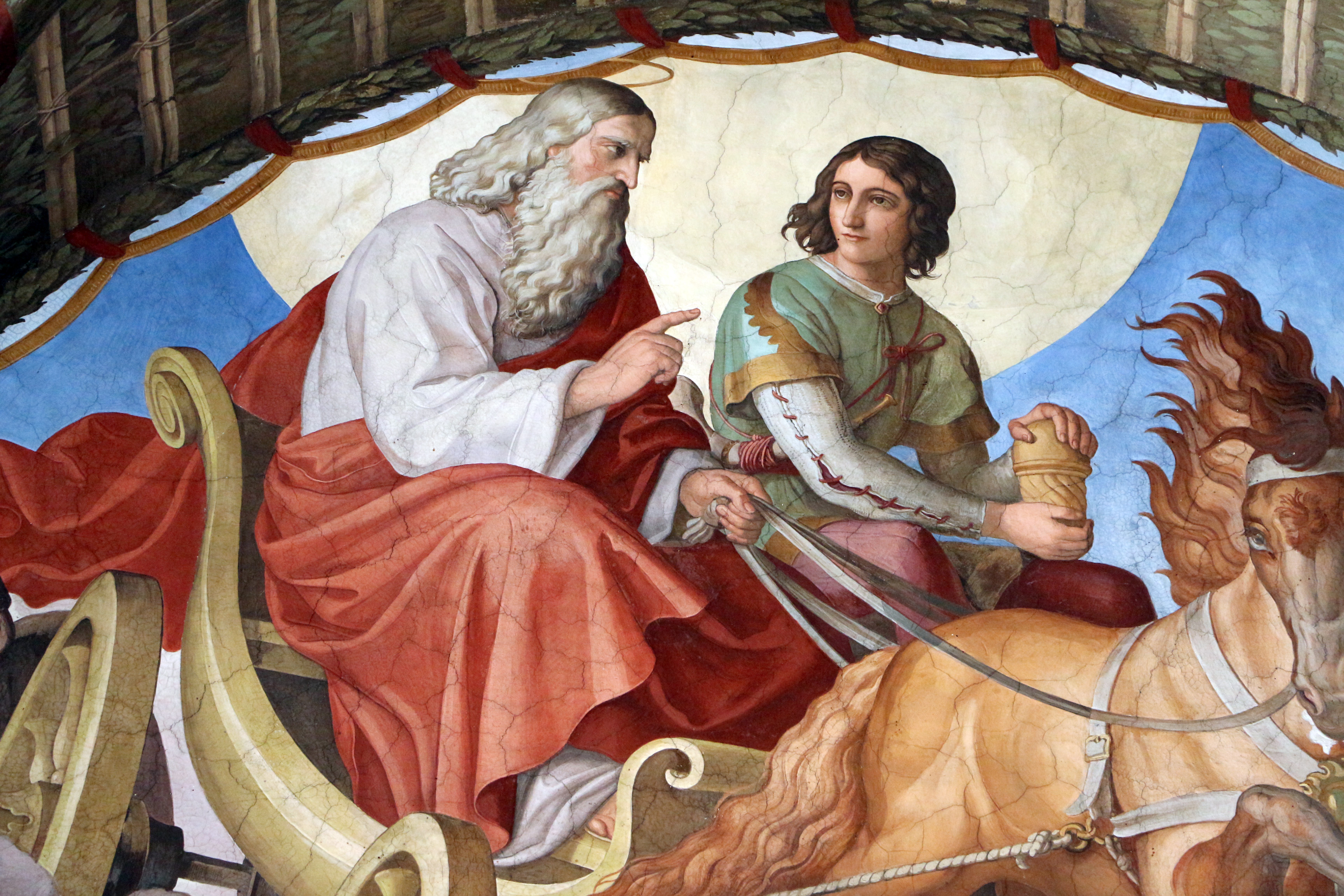
Astolfo and Saint John the Apostle fly back from the Moon in Elijah's flaming chariot.

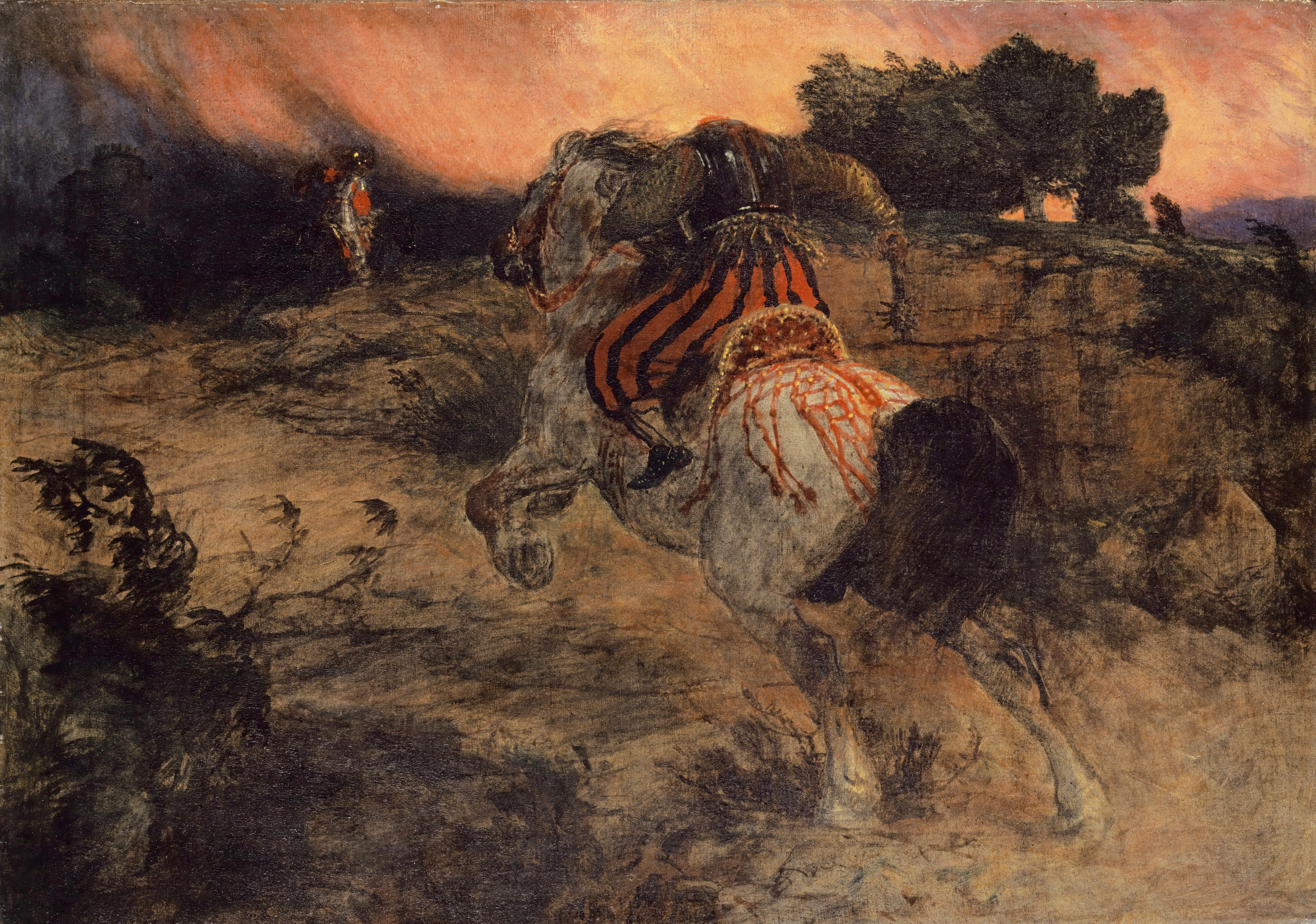
Astolfo rides with Orillo's head.

When first introduced, Duke Astolfo is trapped in the form of a myrtle tree by means of the evil sorceress Alcina's magic. When Ruggiero attempts to tether his hippogriff to the unlucky man, Astolfo protests, lamenting his fate. Although the two converse at length, Ruggiero does not heed the duke's advice to avoid Alcina and he soon becomes bewitched as well. Both are, however, rescued and returned to normal by Melissa, the good sorceress.

Astolfo possesses magical equipment which he employs throughout his adventures. His magical golden spear can knock opponents off their horses with the slightest touch, and his magic book contains spells capable of breaking any enchantment and is very easy to consult thanks to its alphabetical index. He also owns a magic horn, whose blast is so loud that it causes all enemies to flee in terror. He rides a magical horse named Rabicano, made of hurricane and flame, which feeds on air and treads so lightly that it leaves no footprints in the sand, and at full speed can out-run an arrow.

Astolfo defeated the giant Caligorante, who threw a net stolen from the temple (one that Hephaestus had used to capture Aphrodite and Ares during their adultery), then trapped and devoured all the travelers who passed near him. The hero managed to defeat him thanks to the noise of his magic horn that scared Caligorante, who ended up falling into his own net. After defeating him Astolfo parades the giant from city to city, forcing him to act as his beast of burden. He also defeats Orillo, a thief who could not be killed because he was enchanted to regenerate from any injuries he received. Even amputated limbs would be reattached. Astolfo defeated him after looking up his name in the index of his spell book, thus discovering that to defeat him he had to remove all the hair from his head, knowing this Astolfo proceeds to cut off Orillo's head and then escape on his horse while the thief's headless body chases him, after getting far enough away Astolfo sits with the thief's head on his knees and proceeds to cut his hair with his sword, thus killing Orillo. Astolfo loans his golden lance and Rabicano to Bradamante for a short time while he rides the hippogriff in search of Orlando's lost wits.

Astolfo travels to Ethiopia where he met Senapo (Prester John), the emperor of that land. In a situation similar to the story of Phineus from Greek mythology, Senapo is blind and plagued by harpies who attack him whenever he tries to eat a meal, spilling the glasses and befouling the food. Astolfo blows his horn and chases the harpies through the entrance to Hell, and seals them inside. He flies the hippogriff to the summit of the mountain of Terrestrial Paradise, where he meets Saint John the Apostle, who explains how he could return Orlando to his senses. He flies in Elijah's flaming chariot to the Moon, where all things lost upon the Earth end up, and locates Orlando's wits in a bottle. He returns to Earth and gains Senapo's aid in the defense of Paris from the Saracen invaders.

Astolfo has been much analyzed as a mythical hero. From Ferrero (1961) to Santoro (1973) and Vallecalle (1998), and into the twenty-first century, the transformation of the Old French Estout through Franco-Italian poems to Ariosto's masterpiece continues to fascinate readers.

== Origin of the name ==
Astolfo's original French name, Estout, derives from the Old French word estout or estolt, meaning "brave", "proud", or "fierce", which comes from Old Frankish *stolt, *stult-, or *stulta-, meaning "bold" or "stately".

Astolfo, the Lombard or Italian name, derives from the Germanic name Haistulf, a name composed of haist (of uncertain meaning, perhaps "furious", "violent") or perhaps ast ("rod", "spear"), and vulf ("wolf").

Despite the two variations of the name sounding similar, they are not etymologically related as seen above. The Estout to Astolfo shift occurred as the Carolingian traditions began migrating from France to Northern Italy. The first major work in which this name change is seen is the Franco-Venetian epic poem La Prise de Pampelune.

== Legacy ==
- A species of extinct rail was named in honor of Astolfo: Gallirallus astolfoi, or Astolfo's rail.
- An interpretation of Astolfo appears in the Japanese light novel, manga, and anime television series Fate/Apocrypha, and was later also featured in the video game Fate/Grand Order. His popularity as a character in the Fate franchise was deemed to surpass the popularity of the original in modern times. This phenomenon was also observed for other characters in the Fate franchise in a 2021 study, within which the authors named said phenomenon "The Astolfo Effect".
