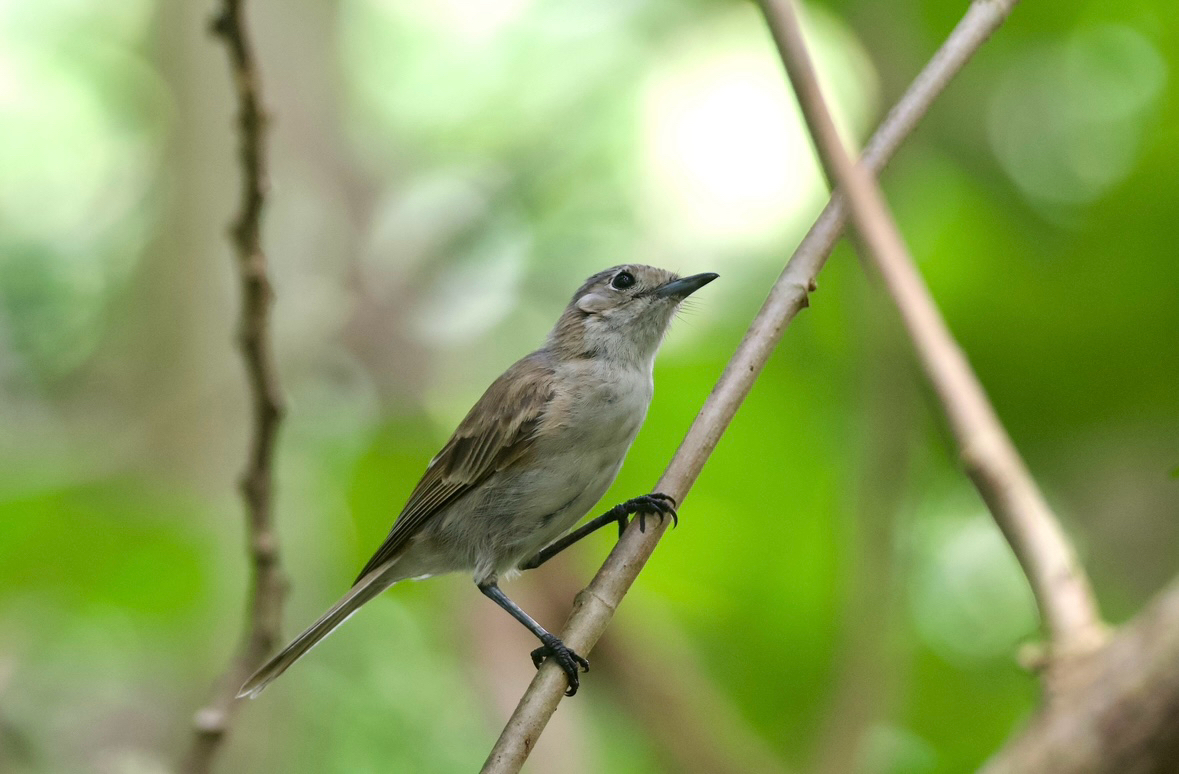

Conservation status
- Critically Endangered (IUCN 3.1)

Scientific classification
- Kingdom: Animalia
- Phylum: Chordata
- Class: Aves
- Order: Passeriformes
- Family: Monarchidae
- Genus: Pomarea
- Species: P. iphis

Binomial name
- Pomarea iphis Murphy & Mathews, 1928

= Iphis monarch =

Species of bird

The Iphis monarch (Pomarea iphis), or Ua Huka flycatcher, is a species of bird in the family Monarchidae. It is endemic to French Polynesia. Its natural habitats are subtropical or tropical dry forests, subtropical or tropical moist lowland forests, subtropical or tropical moist shrubland, and plantations.

== Taxonomy and systematics ==
In 2012, a former subspecies (Pomarea iphis fluxa) was re-classified as the Eiao monarch.

== Distribution and population ==
The Iphis monarch is endemic to the Marquesas Islands in French Polynesia and is restricted to the island of Ua Huka. In 1998 an ornithological study estimated that approximately 500 to 1,200 pairs lived on Ua Huka. This corresponds to about 2-5 pairs per hectare.

== Ecology ==
Nesting pairs of birds were found from anywhere between 30 and 650 meters in elevation on Ua Huka. This bird prefers mid-elevation moist forest and lowland dry forest on the eastern coast of Ua Huka where it forages in dense brush for insects. The Iphis monarch hunts for insects by gleaning insects from branches. This bird also has been known to hunt at night for insects.
