= Nuku Hiva monarch =

Conservation status
- Extinct (IUCN 3.1)

Scientific classification
- Kingdom: Animalia
- Phylum: Chordata
- Class: Aves
- Order: Passeriformes
- Family: Monarchidae
- Genus: Pomarea
- Species: †P. nukuhivae

Binomial name
- †Pomarea nukuhivae Murphy & Mathews, 1928

Synonyms
- Pomarea mendozae nukuhivae

Extinct species of bird

The Nuku Hiva monarch (Pomarea nukuhivae), or Nukuhiva flycatcher, is an extinct species of bird in the family Monarchidae. It was endemic to French Polynesia. Its natural habitats were subtropical or tropical moist lowland forests, subtropical or tropical moist montane forests, and heavily degraded former forest. It became extinct due to habitat loss and introduced predators. The last confirmed sighting was in the 1930s and a possible sighting was reported in 1975.

== Taxonomy and systematics ==
The Nuku Hiva monarch was formerly considered as a subspecies of the Marquesan monarch until elevated to species rank by the IOC in 2012.
