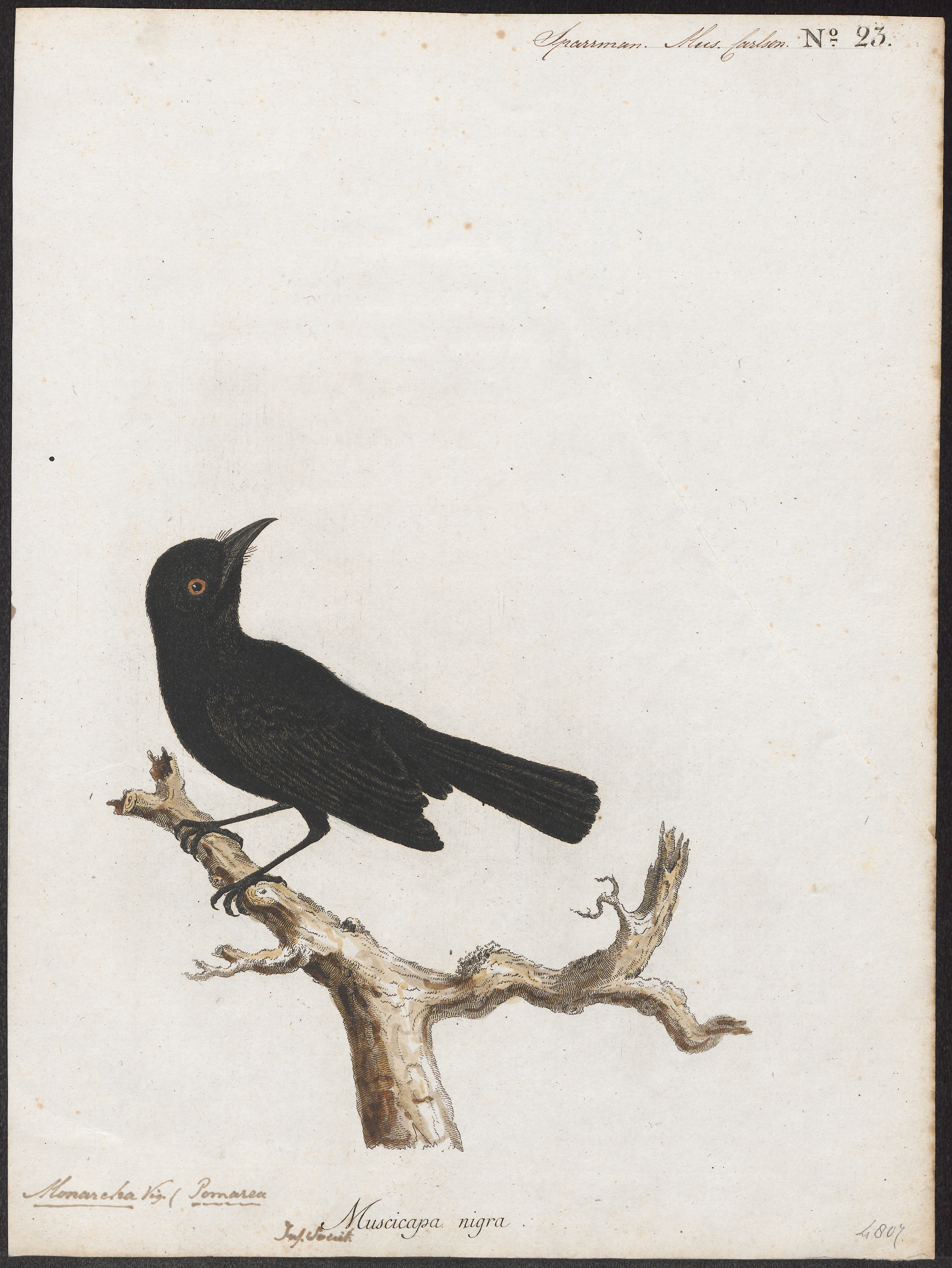

Conservation status
- Critically Endangered (IUCN 3.1)

Scientific classification
- Kingdom: Animalia
- Phylum: Chordata
- Class: Aves
- Order: Passeriformes
- Family: Monarchidae
- Genus: Pomarea
- Species: P. nigra

Binomial name
- Pomarea nigra (Sparrman, 1786)

Synonyms
- Muscicapa nigra

= Tahiti monarch =

Species of bird

The Tahiti monarch (Pomarea nigra) or Tahiti flycatcher is a rare species of bird in the monarch flycatcher family. It is endemic to Tahiti in French Polynesia. There are between 25 and 100 individuals remaining with an increasing population trend. Adults boast a striking black plumage with pale blue pills and feet. Recognized for its melodious flute-like song and distinctive "tick-tick-tick" call, it thrives in dense forest, primarily inhabiting canopy and understory amidst native mara trees. Despite facing threats from introduces predators such as ship rats and invasive bird species, conservation efforts have been implemented to safeguard its population.

== Taxonomy and systematics ==
The Tahiti monarch was originally described in the genus Muscicapa. Formerly, the Maupiti monarch was considered as a subspecies of the Tahiti monarch until re-classified as separate species in 2012.

== Description ==
This bird is 15 centimeters long and black in color with a pale blue bill. The juvenile is reddish brown. The call sounds like tick-tick-tick and the song is "flute-like".

== Distribution and habitat ==
The Tahiti Monarch lives in the canopy and understory in forests among mara trees (Neonauclea forsteri), the last native tree remaining on the island. It inhabits dense forests, typically situated between the altitudes of 80 meters and 4000 meters, primarily found in valley bottoms near rivers.

Native to Tahiti in the Society Islands of French Polynesia, this bird was previously found in only four out of 39 valleys of Tahiti between 1986–1991. A shift was observed in 1998 when the Tahiti Monarch vanished from two of these previously recorded valleys only to emerge in two new valleys. this established their residency in Papehua, Orofero, Tiapa and Maruapo valleys. By 2010, Orofero valley population was reported to have vanished. As of 2019 the Birdlife International Data Zone factsheet, records an estimate of 25–100 adult individuals. Another study done that same year estimated a total of 91 adults.

== Behavior ==
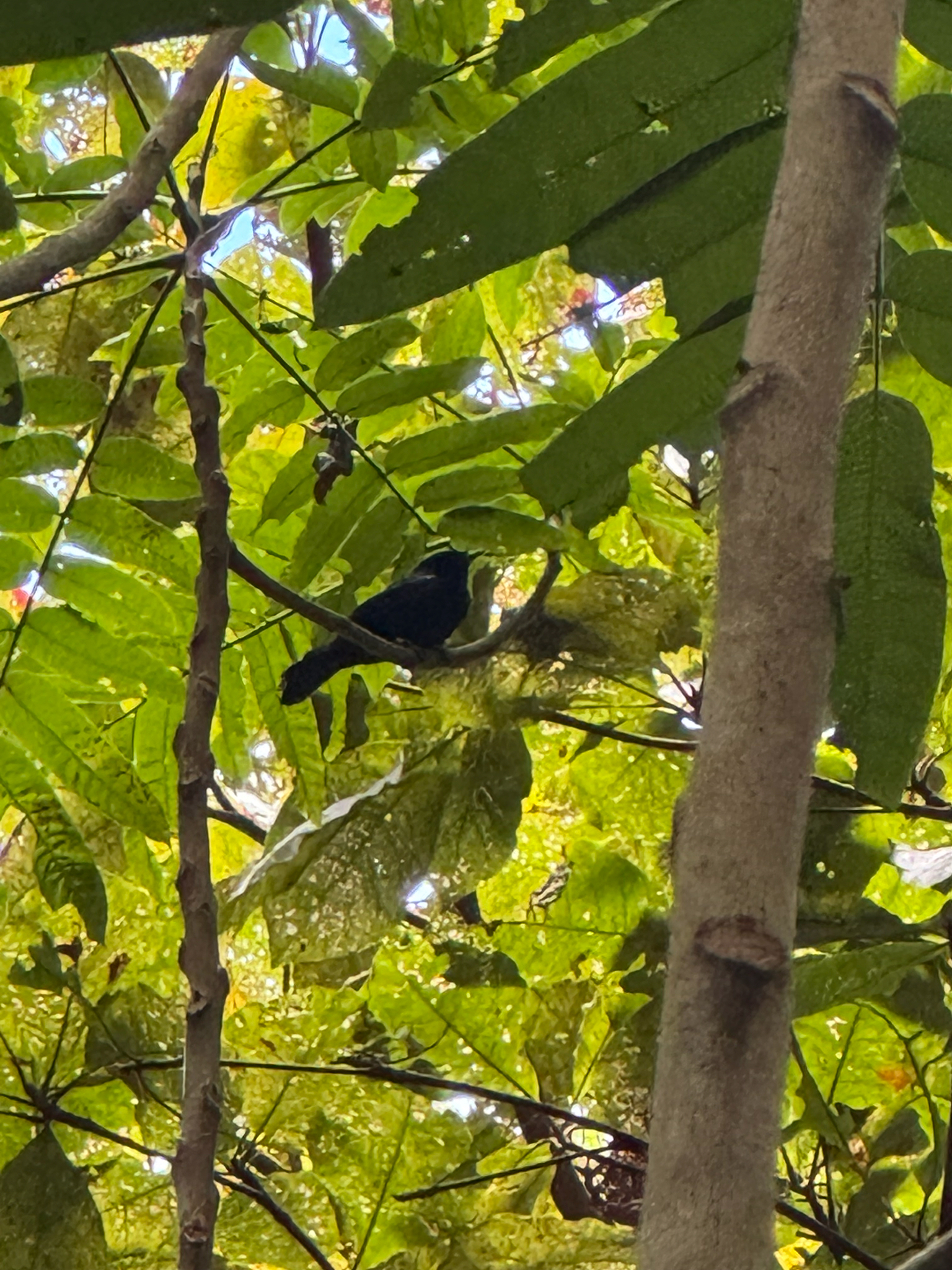
Live bird

This vocal and highly territorial bird keeps its insect foraging activities primarily under canopy or amidst undergrowth with minimal appearance in open areas. The flight pattern is characterized by slow, straightforward movements. Its song is described to resemble that of the Tahiti Reed-Warbler but possessing a more flute like quality. Notably it's alarm call is characterized by a sharp staccato tick sound.

=== Mating and nesting ===
The Tahiti Monarch exhibits monogamous behavior, with varying duration of courtships. They share the responsibilities of nest building, incubation and chick rearing. Interactions between the bonded pairs included beak to beak contact and courtship displays characterized by the male flapping his wings and a distinctive vocalization differing from territorial calls.

Despite demonstrating reduced fecundity, egg laying takes place year-round with heightened activity observed between August and January. Nesting occurs in a fork of branches, opened like a cup and under a protective layer of leaves for rain and sunlight determent. The nests interior is adorned with fronts of small ferns of either Adiantum trapeziforme or A. raddianum. inside it contains a regurgitated mixture, made from minute wood and leaves. Exteriorly, a dash of white spider silk web is occasionally accompanied by small leaves, which is assumed to help aid in the concealment of their nest and structural integrity. the construction of a nest can take anywhere from 4 to 22 days depending on if there is pre exiting structures to work with. In the case of nest failure, this monarch was observed to attempt up to seven replacements in a single breeding season.

== Threats and conservation ==
Tahiti Monarch faces significant predation by black rat. A recovery program initiated in 1998 focusing initially on rodent control, through poison and tree banding, was identified as crucial for reducing the level of predation. These efforts were found to be particularly effective when conducted year-round.

Emerging as another significant ongoing threat, the high presence of introduced common myna (Acridotheres tristis) and the red-vented bulbul (Pyncnonotus cafer) have been spotted in territories experiencing nest failures and early fledgling deaths. The common myna has been known to prey on eggs and chicks. The Red-Vented Bulbul has a pattern of disrupting reproduction and compete for resources. After implementing comprehensive control measures by this program, including shooting, poisoning and trapping campaigns, the results showed a near absence of common Myna from Tahiti Monarch habitat, and Red-Vented Bulbul saw a decrease in population. These efforts towards managing invasive birds were found to enhance the reproductive success of the Tahiti Monarch.

Threats to the species include the degradation of its forest habitat by the invasion of exotic plant species, including Miconia calvescens and Spathodea campanulata. The forest is also degraded by goat activity. Predation by rats and cats is a threat. The Tahiti kingfisher (Todiramphus veneratus) is a competitor.
