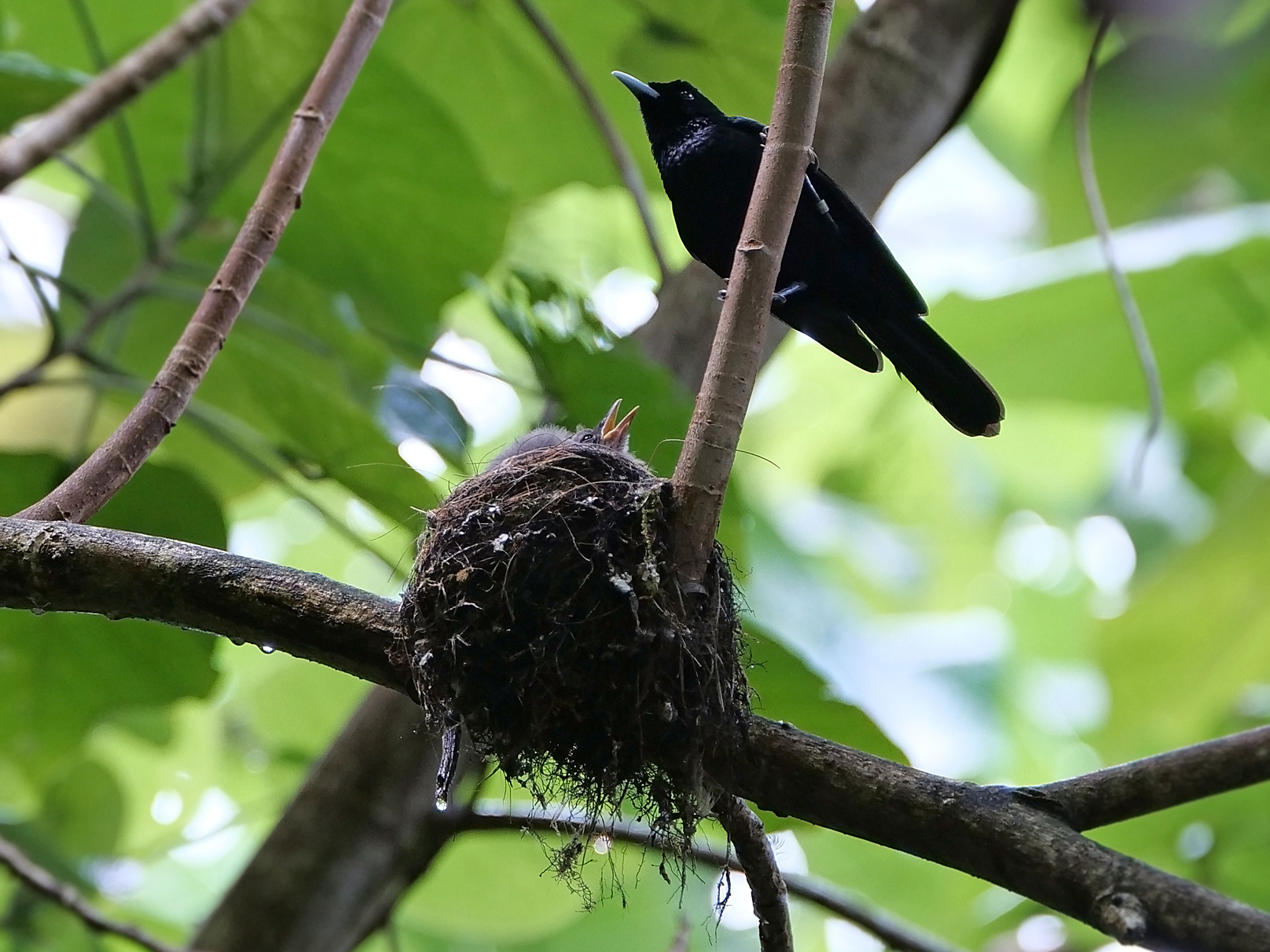

Conservation status
- Critically Endangered (IUCN 3.1)

Scientific classification
- Kingdom: Animalia
- Phylum: Chordata
- Class: Aves
- Order: Passeriformes
- Family: Monarchidae
- Genus: Pomarea
- Species: P. whitneyi

Binomial name
- Pomarea whitneyi Murphy & Mathews, 1928

= Fatu Hiva monarch =

Species of bird

The Fatu Hiva monarch (Pomarea whitneyi) is a large flycatcher in the family Monarchidae. It is endemic to Fatu Hiva in the Marquesas Islands, French Polynesia. It lives in the native dense forest at elevations up to 2300 feet. Adults are a glossy purplish-black with plush-like feathers on their foreheads and grow to around 7 ½ inches.

== Taxonomy and systematics ==
The binomial name commemorates the US philanthropist Harry Payne Whitney. Alternate names include the Fatu Hiva flycatcher, large flycatcher and large monarch.

== Status ==
The Fatu Hiva monarch is assessed as critically endangered, following a decline in excess of 90% over 21 years (three generations). The population is now thought to be as small as 17 birds. This decline is primarily attributed to the introduction of black rats, which were first observed in February 2000 and strongly correlates with the decline and near extinction of the Fatu Hiva monarch. The population decline is also due to feral cats. Recent predator control has happened on Fatu Hiva, though it reduced the rate of territory loss from 60% in 2007–2009 to 30% in 2009–2011.

In July 2023 the Ornithological Society of Polynesia announced a joint program with Auckland Zoo to save the species from extinction. Eggs will be collected for incubation and hatching, and fledglings raised in a predator-proof aviary.
