= Motu One (Marquesas Islands) =

Sandbank in French Polynesia

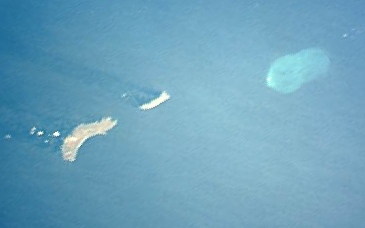
- Northwestern Marquesas Islands. Motu One and its lagoon are the pale blue oval shape in the upper right. Image courtesy of Johnson Space Center.

- Location within Pacific Ocean

Geography
- Location: South Pacific Ocean
- Coordinates: 7.85°S 140.38°W
- Archipelago: Marquesas Islands
- Area: 0.03 km^{2} (0.012 sq mi)

Administration
- France
- Overseas country: French Polynesia

Demographics
- Population: 0 (2002)
- Pop. density: 0/km^{2} (0/sq mi)

Motu One (Marquesan for "Sand Island"; French: Îlot de Sable) is the name of a small sandbank with no vegetation, located on the western edge of a coral reef; the only atoll in the Marquesas Islands.

The reef is approximately 5 kilometres (3.1 mi) in diameter, and the islet has a surface area of less than one hectare, rising only a few feet above sea level and changing shape regularly as the action of the currents deposits and removes sand. Motu One is the northernmost of the Marquesas Islands, located about 30 kilometres (19 mi) northeast of Eiao and 15 kilometres (9.3 mi) northeast of Hatutu. It is a calcareous coral reef on a volcanic plug - the only island in the group not made of exposed volcanic material.

Motu One is administratively part of the commune (municipality) of Nuku-Hiva, itself in the administrative subdivision of the Marquesas.

== History ==
Although Motu One was reportedly visited by Marquesans from islands in the region, primarily on egg-collecting missions, there is no archaeological evidence that it was ever inhabited. The first Westerners to sight the islet were those on the 1813–1814 voyage of the American commander Commodore David Porter, who named it Lincoln Island. Subsequent explorers called it Sand Island.

The Motu One Reserve was declared in 1992, as a first step in preserving the ecosystem of the island. In combination with the declaration of this reserve, several other reserves were declared as a part of the Marquesan Nature Reserves. This includes the Hatutu Nature Reserve, the Motane Nature Reserve, and the Eiao Island Nature Reserve.

== Ecology ==
Green sea turtles nest on Motu One. There is a large stand of Porolithon (Hydrolithon) that is unique in French Polynesia.

There are a wide variety of pelagic birds nesting on the islets including a subspecies of the southern Marquesan reed warbler, the Mohotani Marquesan warbler (Acrocephalus mendanae consobrina).

Since 1992, the whole reef and island ecosystem have been protected as the Motu One Reserve.

== See also ==
- Marquesan Nature Reserves
- Hatutu
- Eiao
