= List of animals of the Marquesas Islands =

The Marquesas Islands have a diverse aquatic zoology, and a rather limited endemic terrestrial zoology.

== Ocean fauna ==
Unlike most of the warm-water islands of the South Pacific, the Marquesas are not protected by coral reefs, and therefore do not have the wide array of reef denizens found in neighboring archipelagos such as the Tuamotus and Society Islands. The one exception to this is the island of Motu One in the extreme north of the group, which is a small atoll, and the only low island in the Marquesas.

Aside from Motu One, coral growths are found in several protected bays, especially on the northern and western sides of several of the islands, especially on Nuku Hiva.

Sharks are common in the offshore waters.

=== Seabirds ===
Nineteen species of seabirds breed in the Marquesas, and a number of other species visit the islands, including:

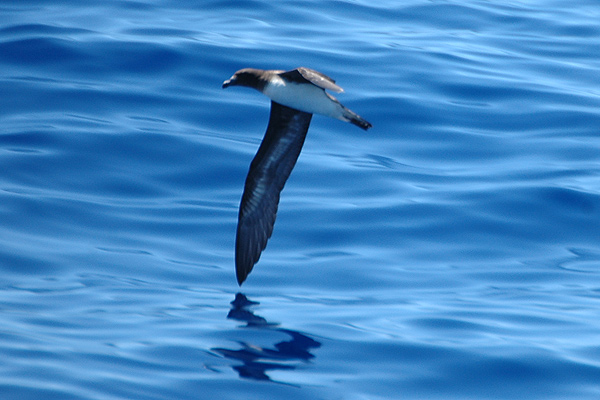
The uncommon Tahiti petrel breeds in the Marquesas Islands

- Sternidae – terns
  - Black noddy (Anous minutus)
  - Blue-grey noddy (Procelsterna cerulea)
  - Brown noddy (Anous stolidus)
  - Sooty tern (Onychoprion fuscatus)
  - White tern (Gygis alba)
- Procellariidae – true petrels
  - Bulwer's petrel (Bulweria bulwerii)
  - Phoenix petrel (Pterodroma alba)
  - Tahiti petrel (Pseudobulweria rostrata)
  - Tropical shearwater (Puffinus bailloni)
  - Wedge-tailed shearwater (Puffinus pacificus)
- Sulidae – boobies
  - Blue-footed booby (Sula nebouxii)
  - Brown booby (Sula leucogaster)
  - Red-footed booby (Sula sula)
- Fregatidae – frigatebirds
  - Great frigatebird (Fregata minor)
  - Lesser frigatebird (Fregata ariel)
- Hydrobatidae – storm-petrels
  - Polynesian storm-petrel (Nesofregetta fuliginosa)
- Phaethontidae – tropicbirds
  - White-tailed tropicbird (Phaethon lepturus)

== Land fauna ==
This should be considered in two separate groups – endemic species and introduced species – as follows:

=== Endemic species ===
The endemic fauna of the Marquesas has been extensively affected by human activity as well as by the introduction of domestic and pest species. Owing to their remoteness from continental landmasses (while they are not the most isolated islands in the world, they are the most distant from any continent), the Marquesas exhibit a paucity of endemic terrestrial species. This is limited to birds, arthropods (including 16 species of fruit fly, moths, butterflies, arachnids, etc.).

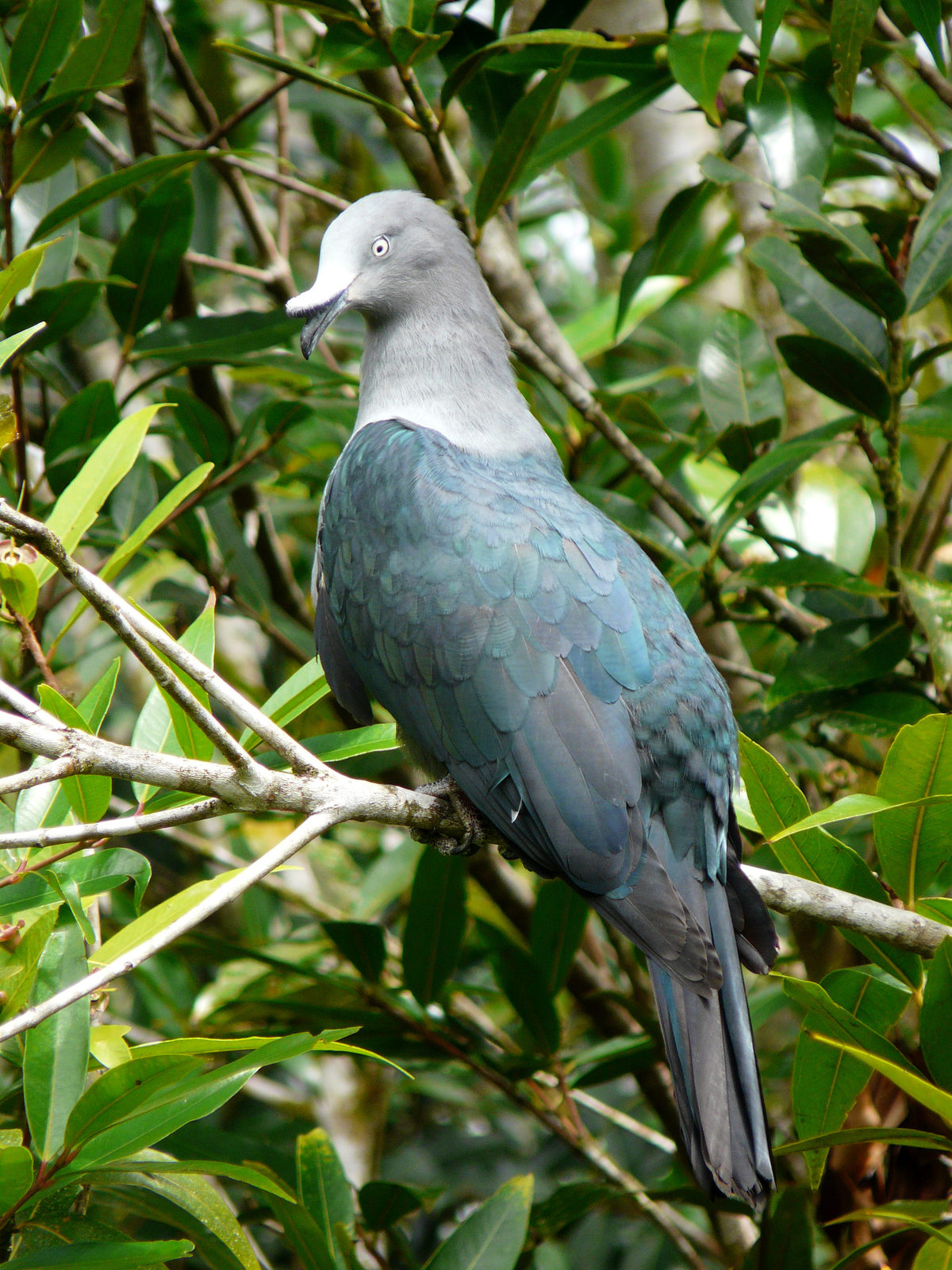
Adult Marquesan imperial pigeon on Nuku Hiva

Among the 11 resident terrestrial bird species, the endemics are:

- Ultramarine lorikeet (Vini ultramarina)
- Marquesas kingfisher (Halcyon godeffroyi)
- Several subspecies of the Marquesan reed-warbler (Acrocephalus mendanae), including the long-billed Polynesian warbler (A. m. postremus)
- Upe (Marquesan imperial pigeon, Ducula galeata)
- White-capped fruit dove (Ptilinopus dupetithouarsii)
- Marquesan swiftlet (Aerodramus ocistus)
- Marquesas ground dove (Gallicolumba rubescens)
- Several Pomarea monarchs

The negative impact of introduced species on the endemic avifauna is seen through the extinction of the red-moustached fruit dove (Ptilinopus mercierii), as well as in the drastic decline of such species as D. galeata, of which only a few hundred specimens remain on Nuku Hiva, and several dozen specimens reintroduced to Ua Huka. Once common throughout the archipelago, the ultramarine lory is now found only on Ua Huka, and as a result of a reintroduction effort, is again found on Fatu Hiva. Various other species which are either threatened or endangered endemic are the Marquesas ground-dove, Marquesas kingfisher, Fatu Hiva monarch (Pomarea whitneyi), Iphis monarch (Pomarea iphis, found only on Ua Huka), and Marquesas monarch (Pomarea mendozae). Extinct rails belonging to Gallirallus including the Tahuata rail, Ua Huka rail, Nuku Hiva rail and an indeterminate species from Hiva Oa are known from archaeological sites.

Among the endemic insects, the adaptive radiation of the gelechioid moth genus Asymphorodes is remarkable, with most of its 80 or so species known only from the Marquesas. Other Marquesan endemic moths include the strange Clarkeophlebia argentea, the enigmatic Marasmianympha eupselias, and Tessema sensilis which is apparently quite common but almost completely unstudied. Another unique endemic insect is the islands' sole praying mantis species, Tropidomantis kawaharai, which is a member of a genus found largely in Asia, about tens of thousands of miles away.

=== Introduced species ===
The early seafaring Polynesians brought dogs, junglefowl, and pigs with them to the islands, and, as stowaways, the now-widespread Polynesian rat and several species of geckos, skinks and snails.

Later, Europeans introduced other species. In 1842, Admiral Abel Aubert du Petit-Thouars brought horses to the island from Chile. Other Europeans brought goats, sheep, and cattle, and, as stowaways, several insect species, (including mosquitos, and sandflies on Fatu Hiva), and scorpions. The common myna and great horned owl have been intentionally introduced onto Hiva Oa. The black rat (Rattus rattus) has been introduced to all the islands; in some cases this has had a drastic negative impact on populations of native bird species.
