= Motu One Reserve =

Nature reserve in Marquesas Islands

Coordinates: 7.868°S 140.378°W

The Motu One Reserve is a nature reserve encompassing the whole of the island and reef system of Motu One in the northern Marquesas Islands. The reserve was declared in 1992 in combination with several other reserves were declared as a part of the Marquesan Nature Reserves. This includes the Hatutu Nature Reserve, the Motane Nature Reserve, and the Eiao Island Nature Reserve.

Green sea turtles nest on Motu One. There is a large stand of Porolithon (Hydrolithon) that is unique in French Polynesia. There are also a wide variety of pelagic birds nesting on the islets including a subspecies of the southern Marquesan reed warbler, the Mohotani Marquesan warbler (Acrocephalus mendanae consobrina) (Murphy & Mathews, 1928).

== See also ==
- French Polynesia
- Marquesan Nature Reserves
