= Eiao Marquesan warbler =

Scientific classification
- Kingdom: Animalia
- Phylum: Chordata
- Class: Aves
- Order: Passeriformes
- Family: Acrocephalidae
- Genus: Acrocephalus
- Species: A. percernis
- Subspecies: A. p. aquilonis

Trinomial name
- Acrocephalus percernis aquilonis (Murphy & Mathews, 1928)

Subspecies of bird

The Eiao Marquesan warbler (Acrocephalus percernis aquilonis) is a subspecies of the northern Marquesan reed warbler found only in the dry upland forest on Eiao in the northern Marquesas Islands.

The species comprises several different races, each of which occupies a variety of forest or bushland habitats.

Because of extensive habitat destruction by feral goats, sheep and pigs, the subspecies is endangered, and may very well be extinct.

The total population was estimated at approximately 100-200 individuals in 1987.

== See also ==
- Eiao Island Nature Reserve
- French Polynesia
- Marquesas zoology
