= Marquesan Nature Reserves =

Nature reserves in French Polynesia

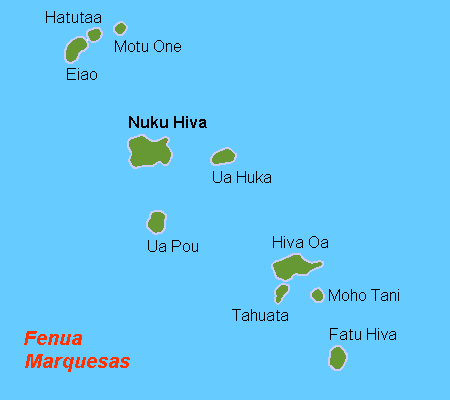
A Map of the Marquesas

The Marquesan Nature Reserves are a network of small nature reserves in the Marquesas Islands. The reserves were declared by the government of French Polynesia in 1992, as a first step toward preserving the native flora and fauna of some of the smaller islands of the group.

The reserve system presently consists of four units:

- Eiao Island Nature Reserve, encompassing Eiao and its surrounding rocks (8.002°S 140.703°W)
- Hatutu Nature Reserve, including the island of Hatutu and its surrounding rocks (7.918°S 140.572°W)
- Motane Nature Reserve, including the islands of Moho Tani and Terihi, as well as a few surrounding rocks (9.986°S 138.829°W)
- Motu One Reserve, covering the coral reef and sandy island network of Motu One (7.868°S 140.378°W)

In 1996 Lucien Kimitete, the Mayor of Nuku Hiva, proposed that the Marquesas become a UNESCO World Heritage Site. In May 2022 public consultations on their listing began.

== See also ==
- Flora of the Marquesas Islands
- List of animals of the Marquesas Islands
