= Marquesan reed warbler =

Marquesan reed warbler has been split into the following two species:

- Northern Marquesan reed warbler, Acrocephalus percernis
- Southern Marquesan reed warbler, Acrocephalus mendanae
