= Hatutu Marquesan warbler =

Hatutaa Marquesan warbler

Scientific classification
- Kingdom: Animalia
- Phylum: Chordata
- Class: Aves
- Order: Passeriformes
- Family: Acrocephalidae
- Genus: Acrocephalus
- Species: A. percernis
- Subspecies: A. p. postremus

Trinomial name
- Acrocephalus percernis postremus (Murphy & Mathews, 1928)

Subspecies of bird

The Hatutu Marquesan warbler (Acrocephalus percernis postremus), also called the Hatutu Polynesian warbler or the long-billed Polynesian warbler, is a subspecies of the northern Marquesan reed warbler. The subspecies is endemic to the island of Hatutu, and one of the primary breeding species in the Hatutu Nature Reserve.

== See also ==
- French Polynesia
- Marquesan Nature Reserves
- Marquesas Islands
