= Eiao Island Nature Reserve =

Nature reserve in French Polynesia

Coordinates: 8.002°S 140.703°W

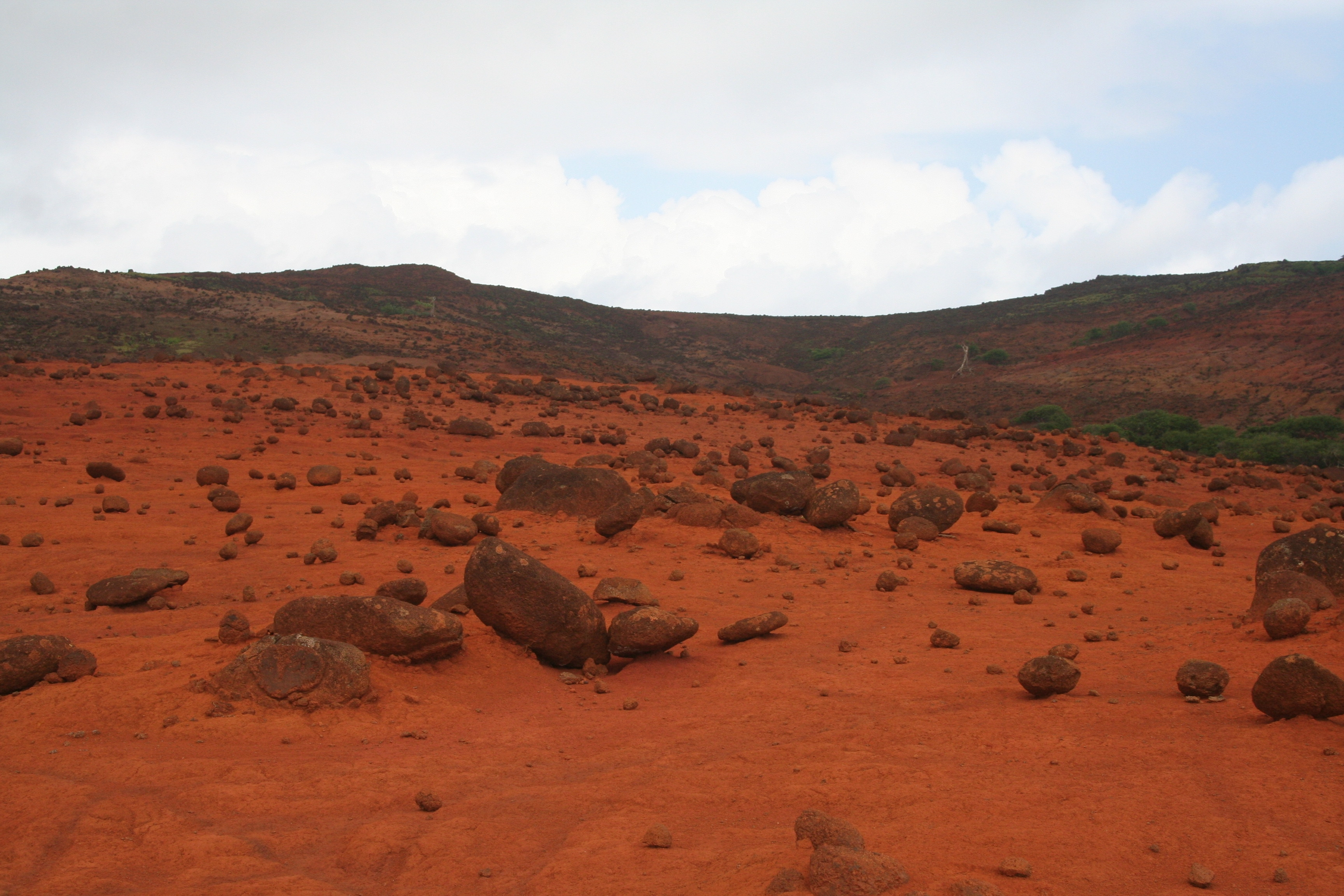

Eiao vegetation map

The Eiao Nature Reserve is a nature reserve encompassing the whole of the island of Eiao in the northern Marquesas Islands, as well as several surrounding rocks.

In the 1970s, the island supported French military activity while it was being considered for nuclear weapons testing. As of 1972, three drilling operations found the island to be too fragile to withstand this type of testing. The reserve was declared in 1992, as a first step in preserving whatever remains of the devastated ecosystem, which has almost entirely been destroyed through over-grazing by feral goats, sheep and swine. In combination with the declaration of this reserve, several other reserves were declared as a part of the Marquesan Nature Reserves. This includes the Hatutu Nature Reserve, the Motane Nature Reserve, and the Motu One Reserve.

The reserve is the primary nesting site of several endangered species, several of which are endemic, including the Eiao Marquesan warbler (Acrocephalus mendanae aquilonis) and the Iphis monarch (Pomarea iphis). In the time before the creation of the reserve, the Eiao monarch had become extinct.

== See also ==
- Eiao
- French Polynesia
- Marquesan Nature Reserves
