= Adolphe-Simon Neboux =

French surgeon and naturalist (1806–1844)

- Born: 22 February 1805; La Châtre, Indre, France
- Died: 5 September 1885 (aged 80); Paris
- Known for: Description of new species of birds
- Awards: Chevalier de la Légion d'honneur, Scientific name of the blue-footed booby (Sula nebouxii).
- Scientific career
- Fields: Medicine, ornithology
- Workplaces: Frigate Vénus, Galápagos Islands

Adolphe-Simon Neboux (1806–1885) was a French surgeon and naturalist who accompanied the frigate Vénus under command of Admiral Abel Aubert du Petit-Thouars between the years 1836 and 1839, visiting the Pacific coastline of North America and the Galápagos Islands.

Among species he described are the swallow-tailed gull and the white-capped fruit-dove. In the Galapagos, he collected specimens of the Galápagos dove, Galápagos martin, medium ground finch and the common cactus finch — these specimens were later presented to the Museum d'Histoire Naturelle in 1839. He is honoured in the scientific name of the blue-footed booby (Sula nebouxii) and the white-naped squirrel (Sciurus nebouxii).

== Works associated with Adolphe-Simon Neboux ==
- Description d'oiseaux nouveaux recueillis pendant l'expedition de la Venus. (1840), Revue Zoologique 3 : 289–291.
- Les journaux de bord du "chirurgien naviguan" Adolphe-Simon Neboux (author: Claudine Rigaudeau-Privat, ed. Jean-Pierre Kernéis), Université de Nantes, (1978).
