= Hatutu =

Island in French Polynesia

Hatutu (Hatuta‘a)
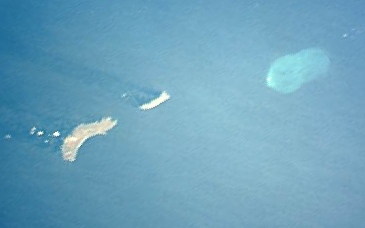
- Image of northwestern Marquesas Islands. Hatutu is the center island. Image courtesy of Johnson Space Center.

Geography
- Location: South Pacific Ocean
- Coordinates: 7.92°S 140.57°W
- Archipelago: Marquesas Islands
- Area: 18.1 km^{2} (7.0 sq mi)
- Highest elevation: 428 m (1404 ft)

Administration
- France
- Overseas country: French Polynesia

Demographics
- Population: 0 (2017)
- Pop. density: 0/km^{2} (0/sq mi)

Hatutu (also called Hatuta‘a) is a small island approximately 3 km (2 mi.) northeast of Eiao in the northern Marquesas Islands. It is approximately 3 km (2 mi) from Eiao by a channel 50 meters deep. It was also known as Hancock, Chanal, Langdon, and Nexsen.

Hatutu is administratively part of the commune (municipality) of Nuku-Hiva, itself in the administrative subdivision of the Marquesas Islands.

It consists of a high central ridge, which runs the full 6.5 km (4 mi.) length of the island. The ridge rises to heights up to 428 m (1,404 ft.) above sea level. Its only anchorage point is in the south of the island for small ships.

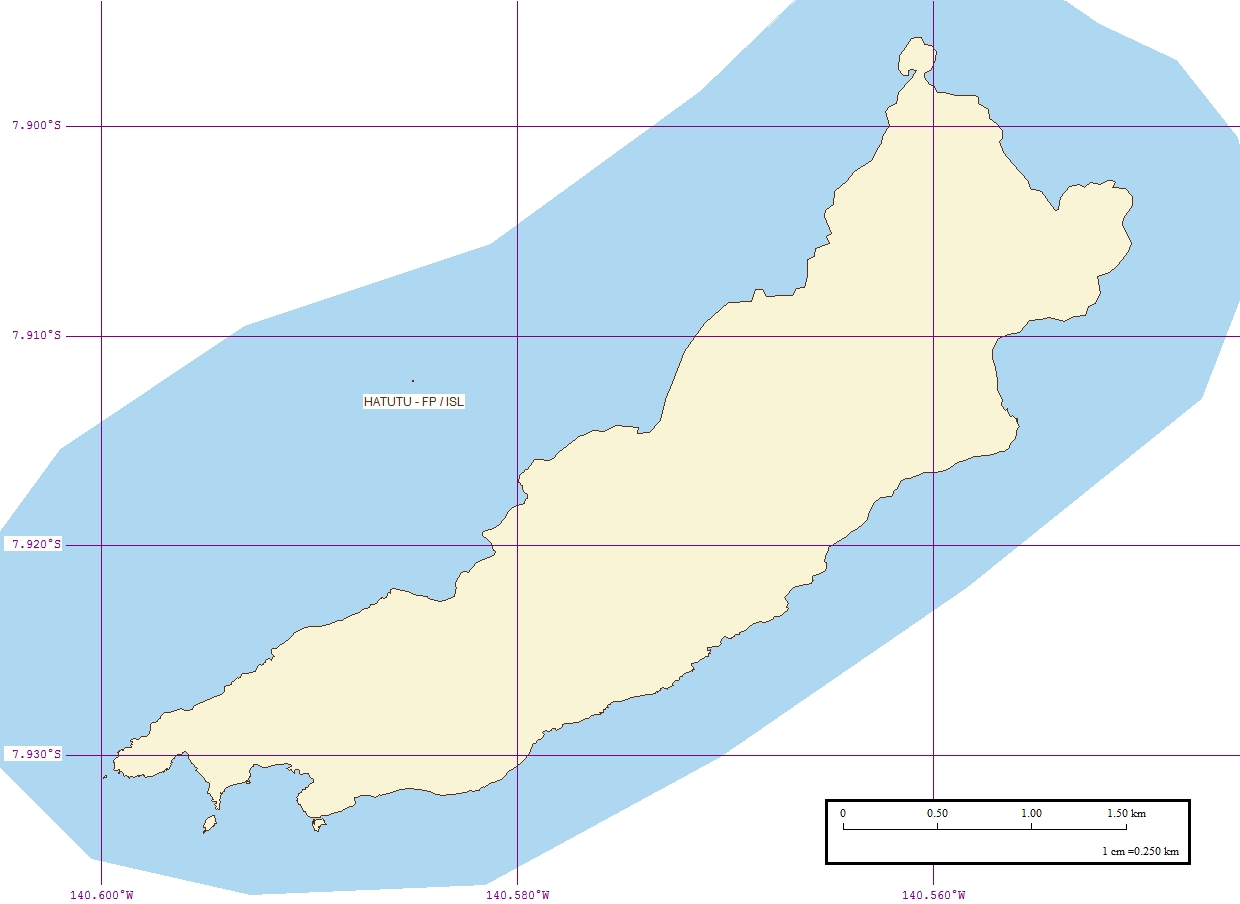
Outline Map of Hatutu

The island was discovered by an American named Joseph Ingraham in April of 1791, and two months later by a Frenchman named Étienne Marchand. There has never been a permanent settlement on the island; however, in 1798, Edmund Fanning reported seeing smoke plumes, suggesting temporary settlement by native people. In 1992, Hatutu was declared a nature reserve: the Hatutu Nature Reserve.

The island is an important nesting ground for red-footed booby, black noddy, white tern, great frigatebird, and masked booby, and home to the endemic northern Marquesan reed warbler and the Marquesan ground dove. It is also the largest breeding site of Phoenix Petrel in French Polynesia. Many native seabirds come to nest on the island throughout the year. The island is also plagued by Polynesian rat (Rattus exulans), a species introduced by humans sometime in the last several hundred years. The rats likely prey on native animals and plants, potentially changing the island's ecosystem dynamics.

== See also ==
- French Polynesia
- Marquesan Nature Reserves
