= Vaituha =

Coordinates: 7°59′42″S 140°42′24″W

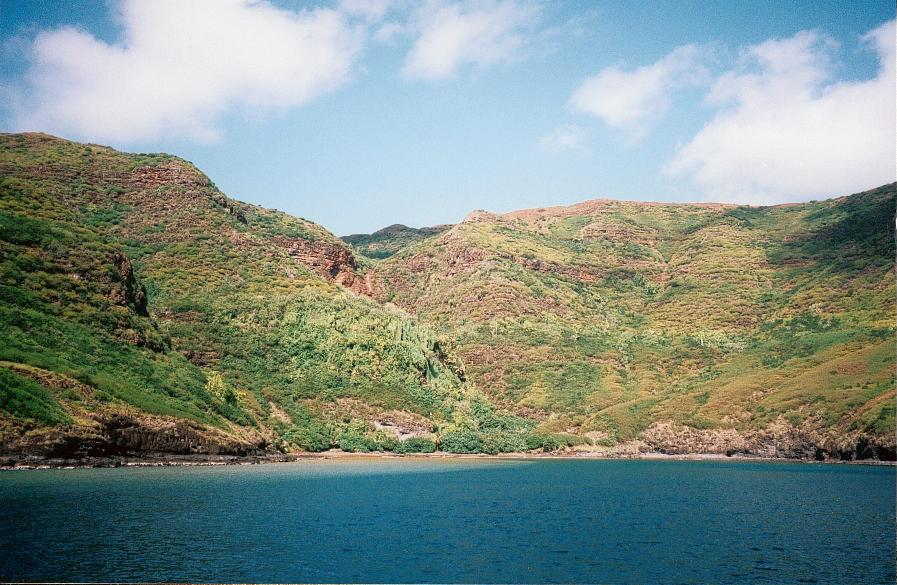
Vaituha bay as seen from the ocean.

Vaituha is a small valley in northwestern Eiao (French Polynesia) in which a small watersource empties into a small bay of the same name. This bay is one of two reliable anchorages on Eiao. The depth of the bay is 27 meters.

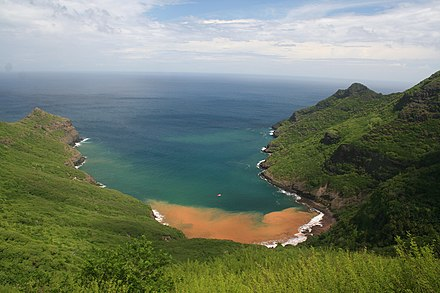
Vaithua bay as seen from Eiao

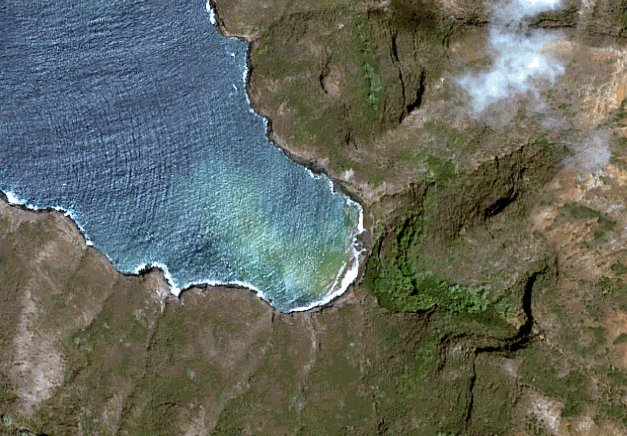
Vaithua bay seen from above.

The interior end of the valley has a seasonally spectacular waterfall emptying of a pebble beach. The high magnesium water is drinkable, but often turns the water in the bay a shade of orange because of eroding silt after rain. This silt and color can stay for weeks and can cause ciguatera in fish. The valley rises steeply to the plateau which comprises much of the center of the island, and is one of the few ascents there. The Vaithua Valley contains most of Eiao's flora and fauna, including wild pigs.

In 1962 - 1963, Georges de Caunes lived on the island in this bay, earning it the temporary title "Bay of Caunes." This was to perform a radio show based on the novel Robinson Crusoe. This was ended in around 100 days due to health complications.
