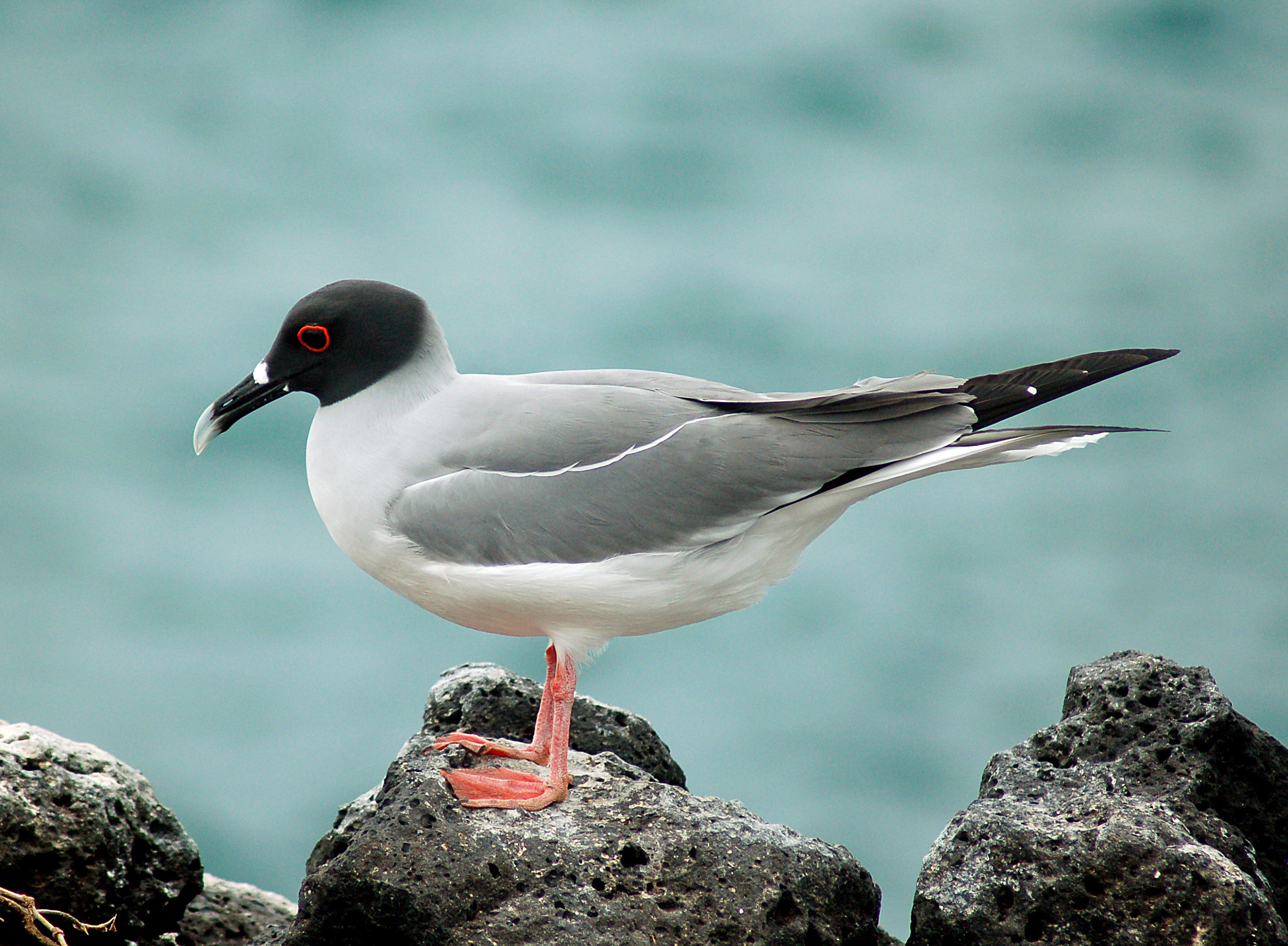
- On the Galápagos Islands

Conservation status
- Least Concern (IUCN 3.1)

Scientific classification
- Kingdom: Animalia
- Phylum: Chordata
- Class: Aves
- Order: Charadriiformes
- Family: Laridae
- Genus: Creagrus; Bonaparte, 1854
- Species: C. furcatus

Binomial name
- Creagrus furcatus (Neboux, 1842)

= Swallow-tailed gull =

Nocturnal species of seabird

The swallow-tailed gull (Creagrus furcatus) is an equatorial seabird in the gull family, Laridae. It is the only species in the genus Creagrus, which derives from the Latin Creagra and the Greek kreourgos which means butcher, also from kreas, meat; according to Jobling it would mean "hook for meat" referring to the hooked bill of this species. It was first described by French naturalist and surgeon Adolphe-Simon Neboux in 1846. Its scientific name is originally derived from the Greek word for gull, "Glaros" and via Latin Larus, "gull" and furca "two-tined fork". It spends most of its life flying and hunting over the open ocean. The main breeding location is in the Galápagos Islands, particularly the rocky shores and cliffs of Hood, Tower and Wolf Islands, with lower numbers on most of the other islands. It is more common on the eastern islands where the water is warmer.

It is the only fully nocturnal gull and seabird in the world, preying on squid and small fish which rise to the surface at night to feed on plankton.

== Description ==
The swallow-tailed gull has no structural or plumage differences between the male and female. In the breeding season, the adult has a black plumaged head and a bright red fleshy rim around each eye. Outside the breeding season, the head is white and the eye rim becomes black. It has a grayish upper breast, gray mantle, and black wingtips. The mostly black bill has a contrasting white tip.

=== Night vision ===
In order to see while hunting for food at night, the swallow-tailed gull's eyes are larger in size and volume than those of any other gull. They also possess a tapetum lucidum in the back of the eye that reflects light back through the retina, increasing the amount of light available to the photoreceptor cells.

=== Melatonin ===
A study of melatonin levels of swallow-tailed gulls found them to have no measurable daily melatonin rhythm, whereas a day-feeding gull that was chosen for comparison had the expected higher night time melatonin level for day active birds. High melatonin levels generally make birds sleepy. It is still unknown whether the melatonin levels are a cause or an effect of the swallow-tailed gulls' nocturnal activity.

== Distribution and habitat ==
The swallow-tailed gull is a near-endemic breeding bird of the Galápagos Islands, although a few pairs nest on Malpelo Island off the coast of Colombia. When not breeding, it is totally pelagic, flying and hunting over the open oceans, and migrating eastward to the coasts of Ecuador and Peru.

== Behaviour ==
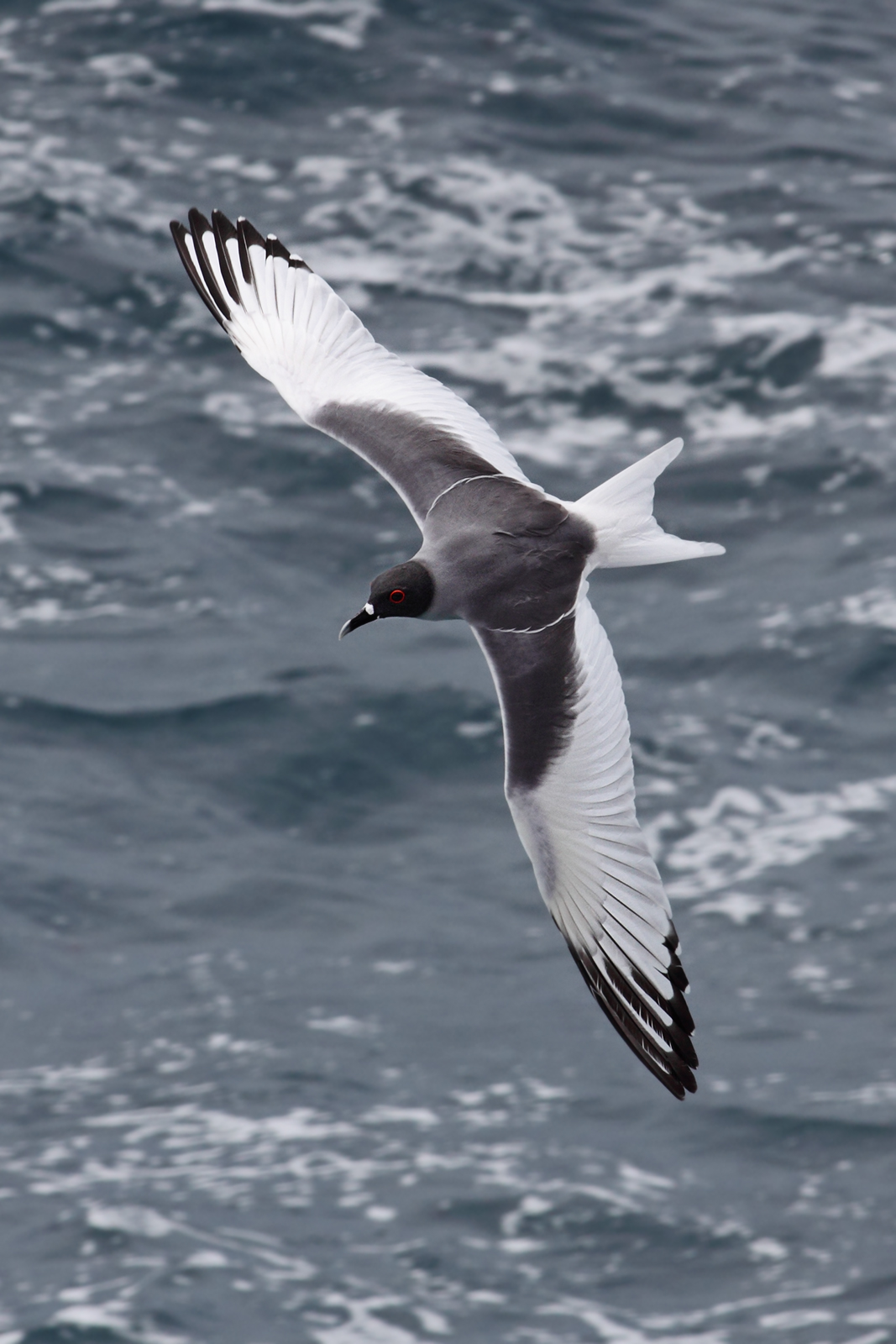
Dorsal view

=== Food and feeding ===
The swallow-tailed gull is unique among the gulls in feeding exclusively nocturnally, mostly on fish and squid which rise to the surface at night to feed on plankton. It leaves the colony as a flock at dusk, with a great deal of screaming and display.

=== Calls ===
Calls and displays are quite different from other gulls, most resembling the vocalisations of the black-legged kittiwake and Sabine's gull. The loudest and most commonly heard call is an alarm referred to as "rattle-and-whistle", a gurgling scream made with the head moving side to side. This call is contagious, with other birds joining in without seeing the cause. A loud and rapid kweek, kweek, kweek is the greeting call between mates, made with the head and neck curved forward to the ground.

=== Breeding ===
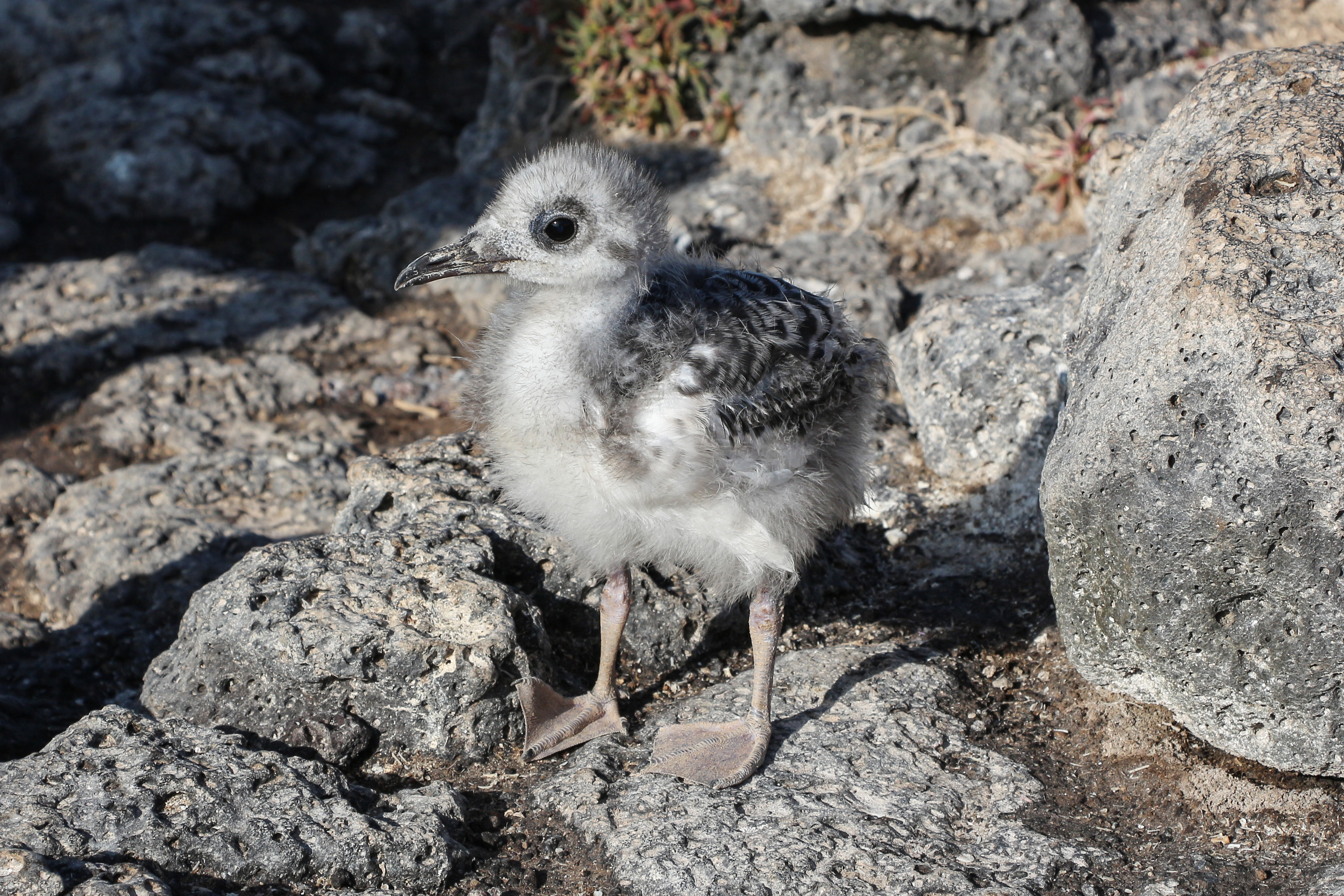
Juvenile swallow-tailed gull in Galápagos Islands

The swallow-tailed gull breeds from about 5 years old, with pairs frequently staying together from year to year. Most breed throughout the year in mixed colonies on the cliffs of the Galápagos Islands sometimes on flat areas, and food for the young is hunted from the seas near to the nesting colonies. The nest is made on a small platform on a cliff, usually less than 10 m above sea level, by covering the rocky ground with small pieces of lava, white coral, and sea urchin spines, which prevent the egg from rolling. Nesting birds tend to face the cliff, a habit common among exclusively cliff nesting gulls, such as the black-legged kittiwake. The female usually lays one speckled egg per breeding attempt. They are asynchronous breeders (can breed any time of the year), and follow a nine-month cycle, or less if an egg or chick is unsuccessful. The egg is generally incubated for 31–34 days. A chick takes its first flight at about 60–70 days old, and is fed by the adults until about 90 days, when it leaves the land, possibly with the adults, to live over the open seas.

== Status ==
Population trends have not been estimated, but it is not thought to be threatened. The population was estimated to be about 35,000 individuals when it was last considered in 2004.

== Gallery ==
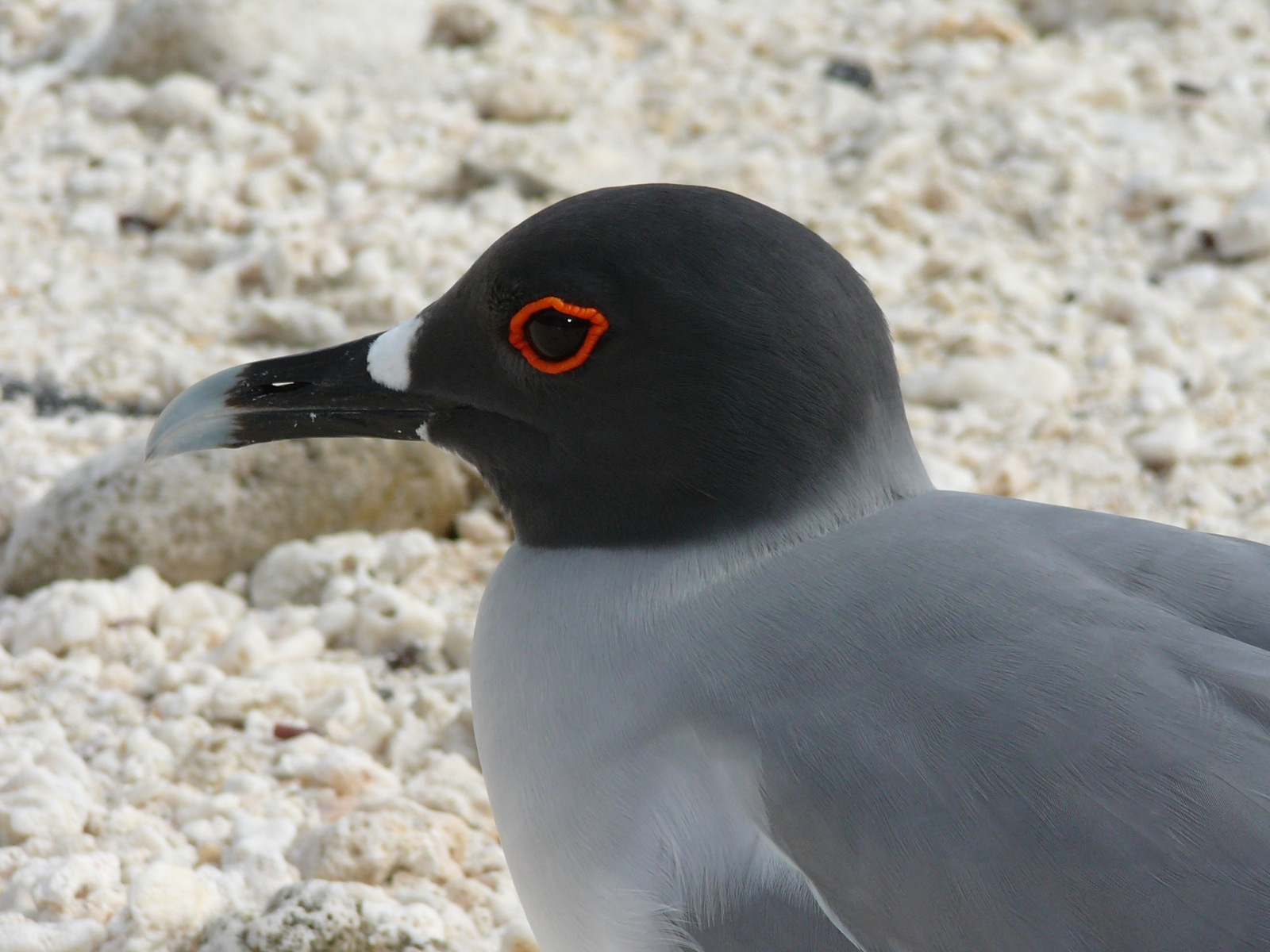
Close-up of head and neck of an adult on the Galapagos Islands. Its plumage and the red ring around its eye shows that it is in breeding condition.

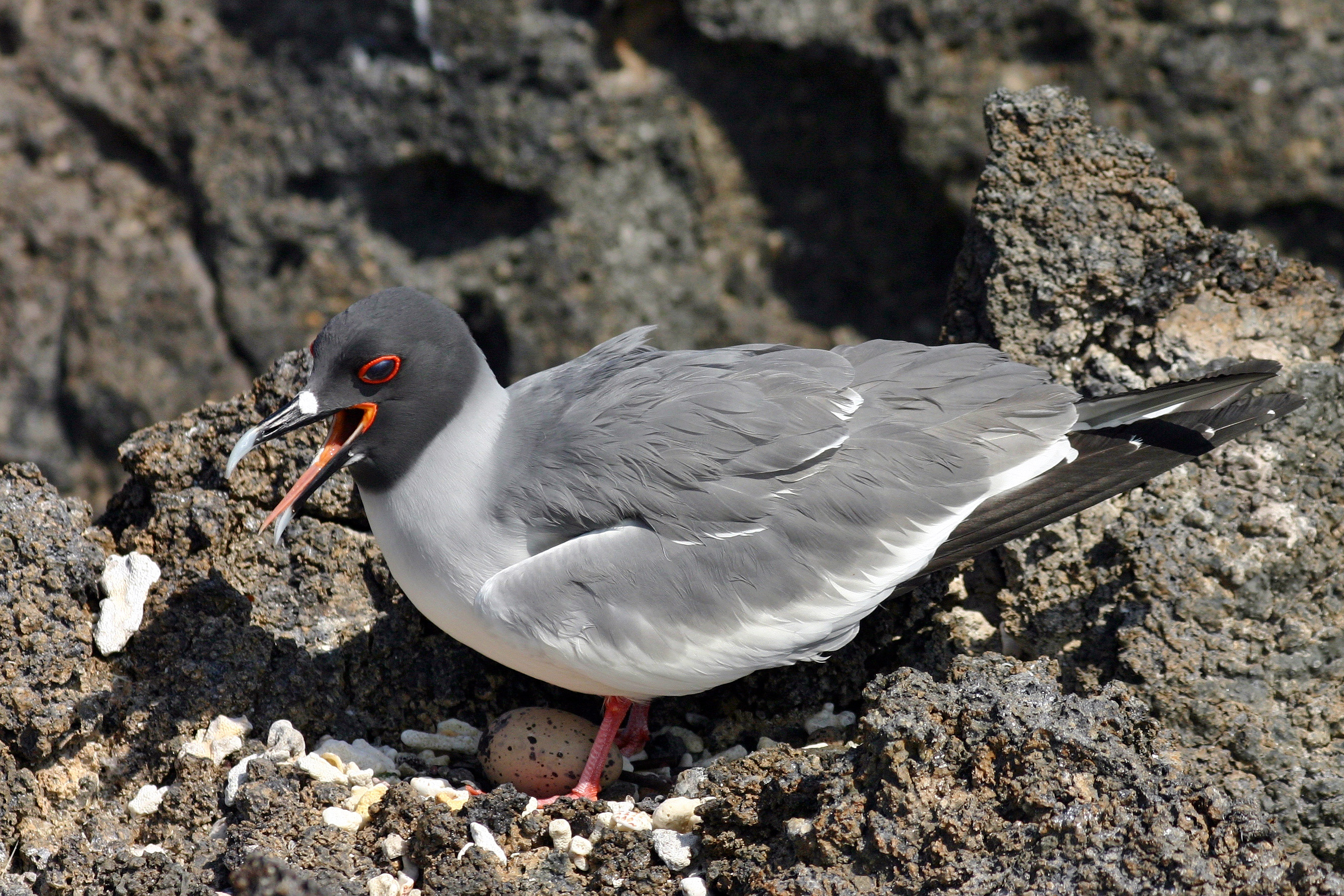
Nesting with egg

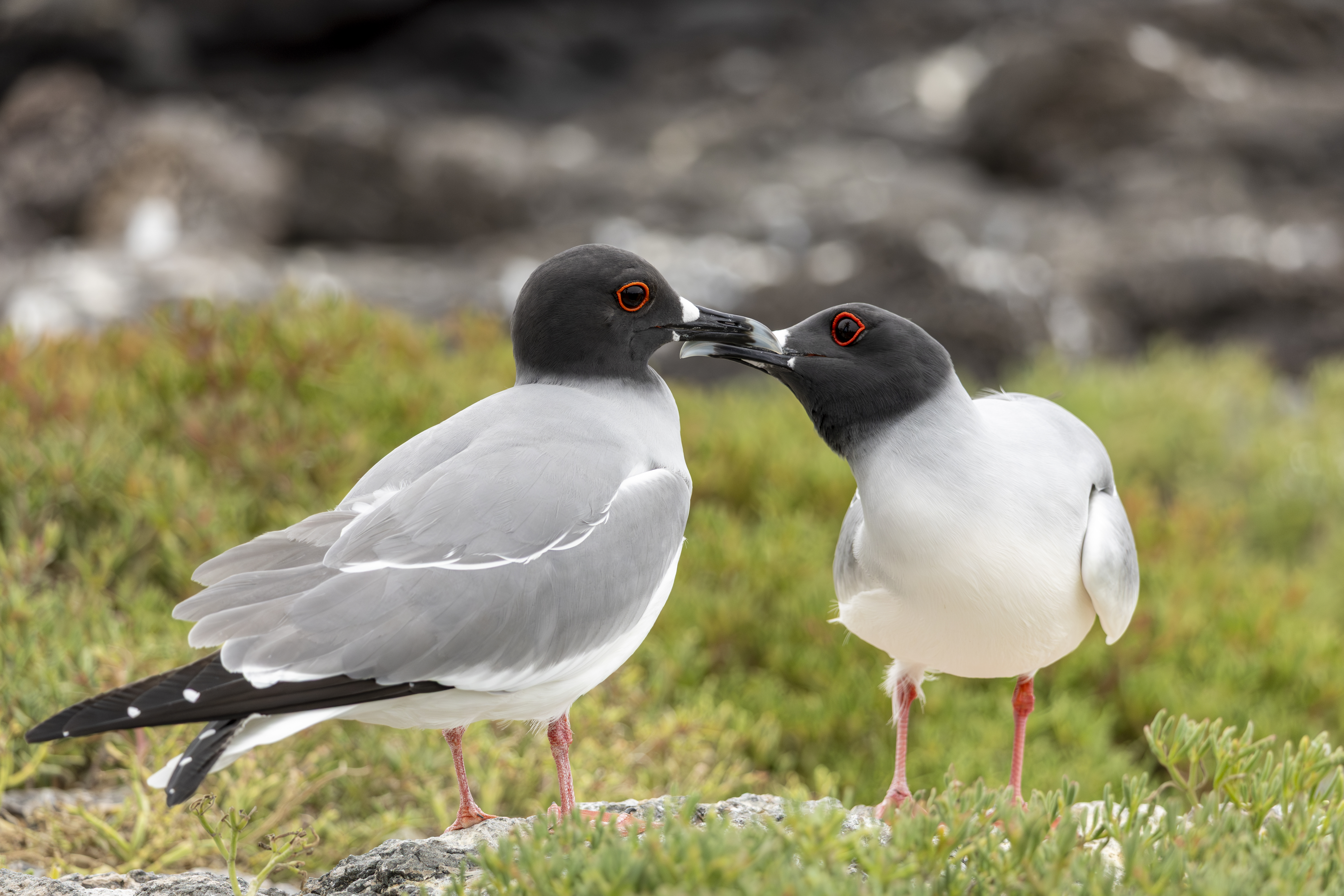
Courtship

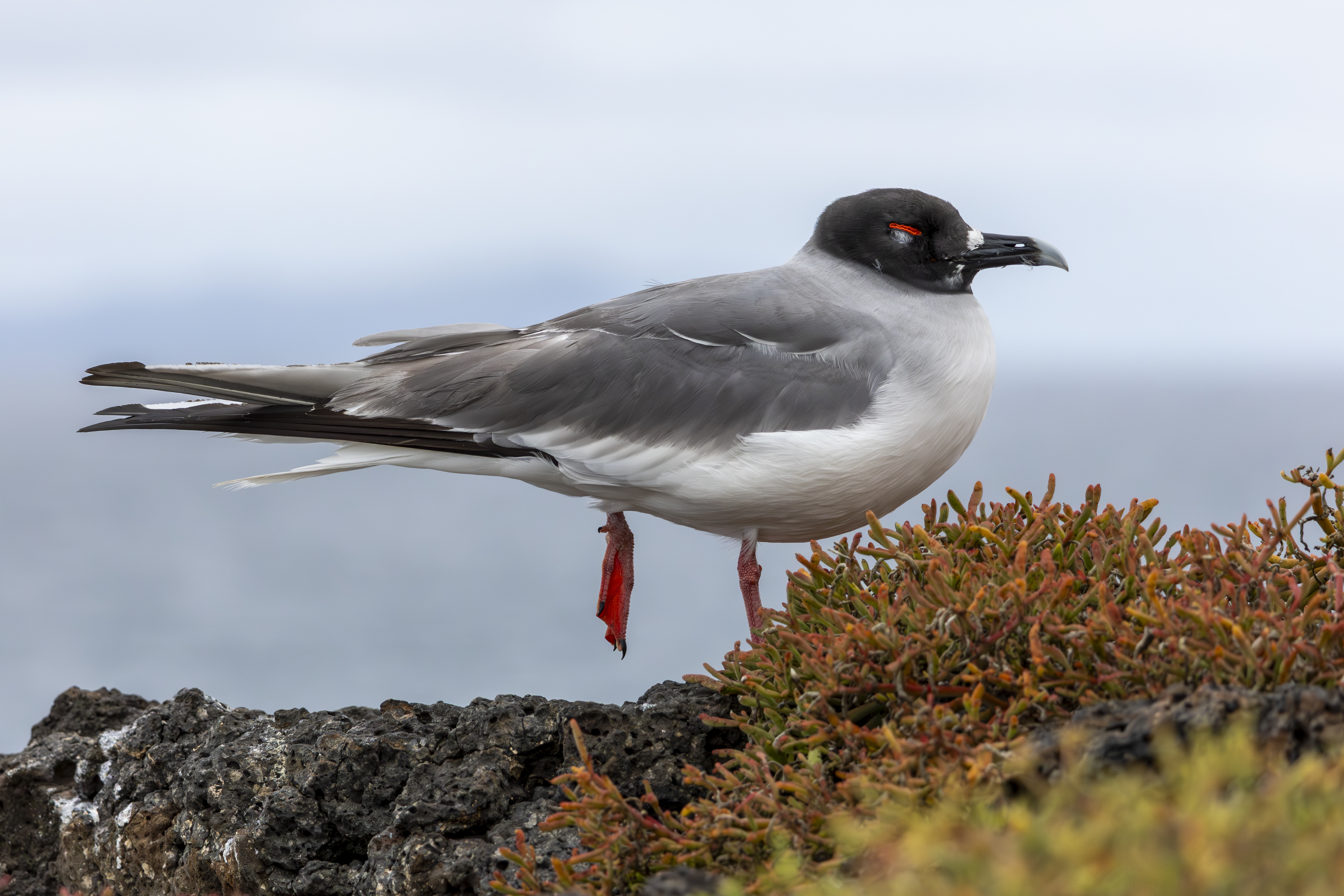
Resting
