= Flora of the Marquesas Islands =

The Marquesas Islands have a diverse flora, with a high rate of endemism. They are in the floristic Polynesian subkingdom of the Oceanian realm.

== Food Plants ==
Most of the food plants are not endemic, and include:

- Avocados
- Bananas
- Breadfruit (mei) from which "mā" is made.
- Cashews
- Coconuts
- Jambul
- Grapefruits
- Guavas
- Lemons
- Mangos
- Pandanus
- Papayas
- Pineapples
- Plantains
- Soursops
- Sugar apples
- Taro (taʻo) from which "poke", similar to poi, is made.
- Vanilla

== Other plants ==
- Frangipani
- Hibiscus
- Mape
- Nono
- Tiara

Pelagodoxa henryana, the only species in the genus Pelagodoxa, is a palm tree that is endemic to the Marquesas Islands.

== See also ==
- Marquesan Nature Reserves
