= Mohotani =

Island in French Polynesia

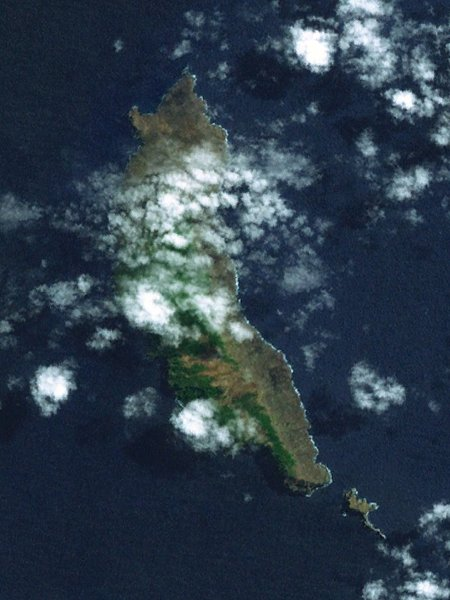
- Moho Tani viewed from space

- Location of Mohotani within the Marquesas Islands

Geography
- Location: South Pacific Ocean
- Coordinates: 9.9838°S 138.8296°W
- Archipelago: Marquesas Islands
- Area: 15 km^{2} (5.8 sq mi)

Administration
- France
- Overseas country: French Polynesia

Mohotani (sometimes spelt Moho Tani; also called Molopu or Motane) is an uninhabited island southeast of Hiva Oa and east of Tahuata in the southern Marquesas Islands. It has an area of 15 km^{2}. Much of the island's sparse vegetation has been destroyed by feral goats and sheep, to the extent that following its rare rains, the sea around it is stained red from runoff. Early reports describes the island as fertile, with forest and fields. When Thor Heyerdahl visited the island in 1938, there were only a few goats and remains of deserted huts and villages.

Mohotani is administratively part of the commune (municipality) of Hiva-Oa, itself in the administrative subdivision of the Marquesas Islands.

It is reported that at one time the island was inhabited by a clan called the "Moi a Tiu", but that population has long since been wiped out by disease and war, the few survivors having departed for Hiva ʻOa. In pre-European times, the island was considered part of the territory of the province of Pepane.

In 1992, the island and its surrounding smaller islands (including Terihi) were officially protected by the declaration of the Motane Nature Reserve.

== History ==
Before the arrival of westerners, Mohotani was inhabited by the Moi a Tiu tribe. It was the smallest inhabited island in the archipelago. Decimated by fighting and disease brought by foreign sailors, the few survivors eventually abandoned the island and headed for Hiva Oa.

Mohotani is uninhabited today, but there is clear archaeological evidence to suggest a permanent Polynesian settlement. American anthropologist Ralph Linton (1893–1953) located the remains of a settlement. Thor Heyerdahl found several stone house platforms (paepae) in the arid east of the island during a brief foray in 1938. The island was inhabited by a single clan called "Moi-Atiu," a collateral line of a tribe from Hiva Oa.

Mohotani was discovered by Europeans in 1595 by the Spanish navigator Álvaro de Mendaña de Neyra on his second voyage to Europe. He did not set foot on the island, but named it "San Pedro" in honor of Saint Simon Peter and in reference to the name of its captain, Pedro Fernández de Quirós. Mendana described it as an island "covered with much forest" and could see no signs of inhabitants.

James Cook, during his second voyage to the Pacific, passed through the strait between the islands of Hiva Oa and Mohotani on April 7, 1774, but without entering Mohotani. He describes the island as follows.

"San Pedro [Mohotani] is rather high, but not mountainous, and is about 3 leagues in circumference. [The island] lies 4 ½ Leagues south of the eastern point of La Dominica [Hiva Oa] and we do not know whether it is inhabited or not, probably not, however, as nature does not seem to have endowed it with anything that men require."

— James Cook

In the cartographic sketch of William Wales, astronomer aboard the Resolution, Mohotani is marked with the name "Onateayo", probably the name given to it by the inhabitants of the island of Hiva Oa.

In 1992, it was declared "Motane Island Nature Reserve" (réserve naturelle de l'île de Motane) to protect its endangered ecosystem. The reserve extends to Terihi islet, which is home to colonies of seabirds such as gannets, terns and frigate birds.

== Geography ==
Mohotani is located 17 km south and southeast of Hiva Oa, 21 km east of Tahuata and 47 km north of Fatu Iva. With an area of 15 km^{2}, it forms an open crescent to the east, about 8 km long from north to south and 2 km wide at most from east to west.

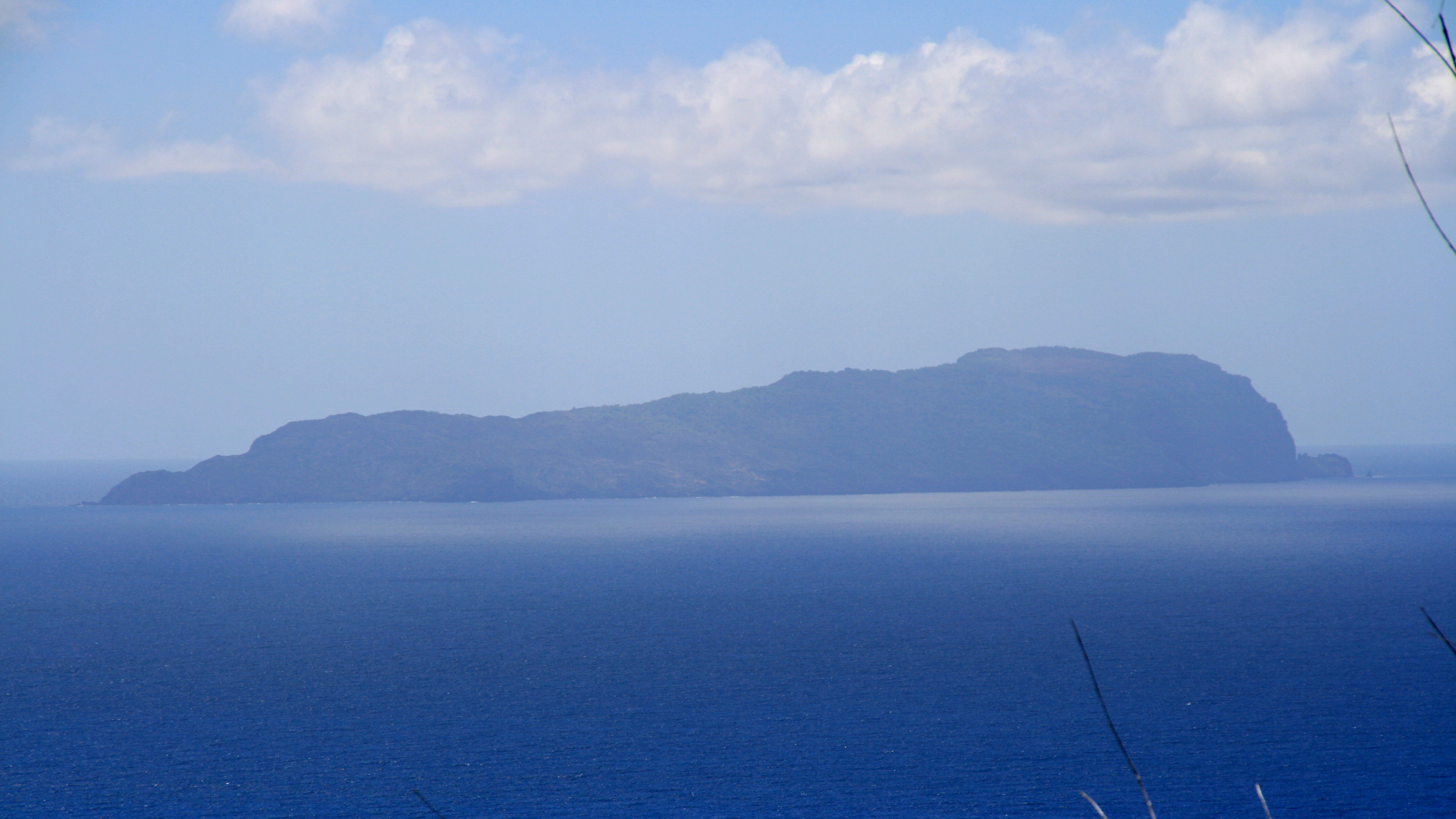
View of the island

It is a high island, with its highest elevation (520 meters) in the south, and its overall shape resembles the back of a whale.

=== Terihi ===
At 300 meters to the southeast is Terihi, a rocky islet of 0.150 km^{2} with a very steep coastline and a total perimeter of 3.4 kilometers, which is part of the same volcanic complex. It rises 245 meters above sea level.

The flora is sparse and consists mainly of the hardy grass Eragrostis xerophila and the slow-growing nightshade Nicotiana fragrans var Fatuhivensis, a species endemic to Fatu Hiva and Mohotani.

=== Geology ===
Mohotani corresponds to the west-southwestern part of a collapsed caldera, which belonged to a much larger volcano, about ten kilometers in diameter. This volcano was born from the presence of a hot spot in this part of the world, several million years ago.

The island was formed in two phases, the most recent of which dates from about 2.2 million years ago. It is composed mainly of basalt.

== Flora and fauna ==
Mohotani has been protected since 1971 (French Polynesia Sites Commission, Order No. 2559 of July 28, 1971). Hunting is regulated and requires a permit, but the remote island is also visited without a permit. In addition, trees are illegally cut down to obtain wood for the souvenir industry. Effective management and monitoring of the protected area is still lacking.

Sheep introduced by French settlers from Hiva Oa in the second half of the 19th century have run rampant and cause erosion by grazing low vegetation.

=== Flora ===
Mohotani can be divided into three vegetation zones: The east is arid over a wide swath, the north has little vegetation, and the west center of the island is covered by dense forest that remains largely pristine.

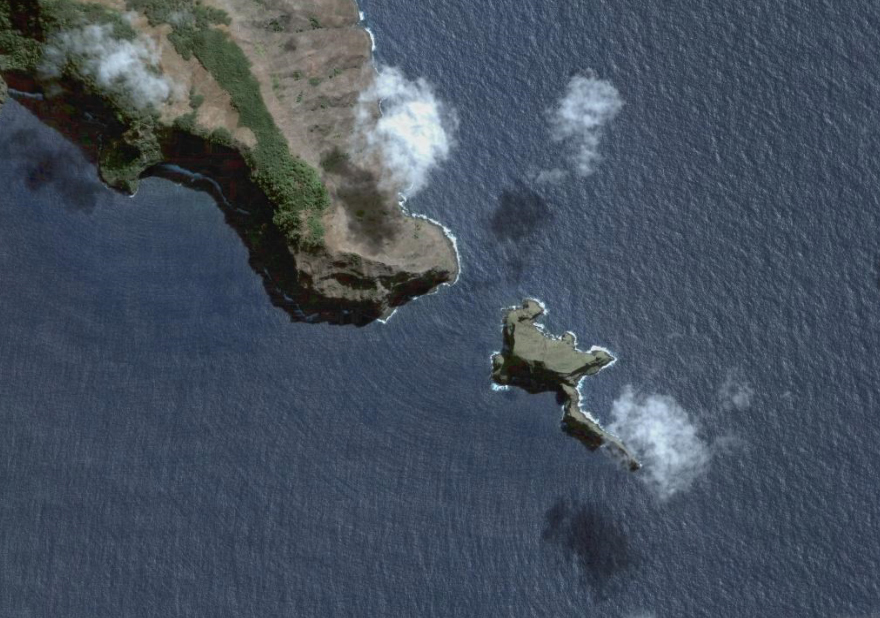
Terihi Islet

The entire east is arid due to animal browsing, and vegetation cover is sparse. In favorable locations, Nicotiana fragrans var. fatuhivensis, which belongs to the tobacco plants and is endemic to Fatu Hiva and Mohotani, purslane (Portulaca oleracea), and the herbs Eragrostis xerophila and Brachiaria reptans grow.

The northern part of the island is also severely damaged by grazing. The evergreen shrub Arbutilon hirtum, Cordia lutea and Waltheria tomentosa appear as low-growing forms. Pisonia grandis, Premna tahitensis and Morinda citrifolia also grow in the few places that are not accessible to animals.

The central plateau, in the west, is covered by a dense forest area that covers about a quarter of the island. It consists of giant Pisonia grandis, which not infrequently reach a height of 30 to 40 meters. Other common trees are Cordia subcordata, Thespesia populnea, Hibiscus tiliaceus, Pandanus tectorius, Ficus marcuesensis, Casuarina equisetifolia, and occasional coconut trees among them.

=== Fauna ===
There are only three species of mammals, none of which is indigenous: the Pacific rat, probably introduced by Polynesians as a food animal, sheep, which Europeans settled in the 19th century, and feral cats.

Ten species of seabirds and seven species of land birds, two of which are endemic, have been observed in Mohotani:

Frigatebirds nest in the large pisonias. Other seabirds found at Mohotani and Terihi include noddi (Anous stolidus), sooty tern (Sterna fuscata) and fairy tern (Gygis alba).

Among the landbirds, the Marquesas monarch, in the Pomarea mendozae montanensis variation, and Acrocephalus caffer consobrinus, a subspecies of the long-billed warbler, are endemic. Other rare and threatened species include the Marquesas warbler (Acrocephalus mendanae), the Marquesas salangana (Aerodramus ocistus), and the Petit-Thouars fruit pigeon (Ptilinopus dupetithouarsii).

== See also ==
- Terihi
- Desert island
- List of islands

== Resources ==
- Christian, F.W. Eastern Pacific Lands, Tahiti and the Marquesas Islands. London, 1910.
- Heyerdahl, Thor: Fatuhiva
