= Terihi =

Island in French Polynesia

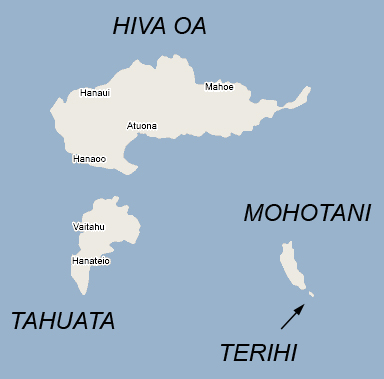
- Map of Terihi

Geography
- Location: South Pacific Ocean
- Coordinates: 10°01′05″S 138°48′08″W
- Archipelago: Marquesas Islands
- Area: 0.15 km^{2} (0.058 sq mi)
- Coastline: 3.40 km (2.113 mi)

Administration
- France
- Overseas country: French Polynesia

Demographics
- Population: 0

Terihi is a small, uninhabited, rocky island in the Marquesas Islands, less than 300 m (0.19 mi) southeast from Mohotani. It has an area of 0.15 square kilometres (0.06 square miles) and a coastline of 3.40 kilometres (2.11 miles).

In 1992, the island became officially protected by its inclusion in the Motane Nature Reserve.

== See also ==
- French Polynesia
- Desert island
- List of islands
