= Eiao =

Uninhabited Island in French Polynesia

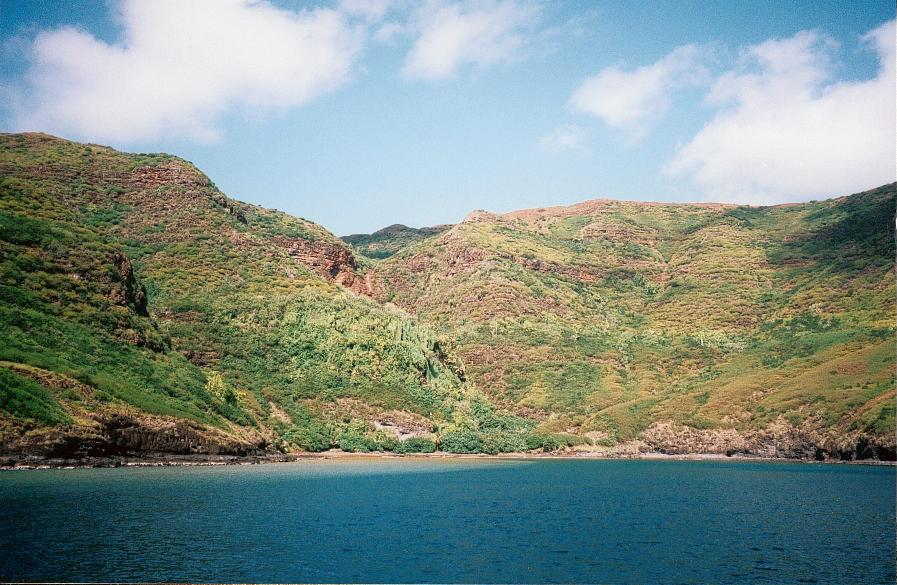
- Vaituha bay on Eiao

Geography
- Location: South Pacific Ocean
- Coordinates: 8°S 140.7°W
- Archipelago: Marquesas Islands
- Area: 43.8 km^{2} (16.9 sq mi)
- Highest elevation: 576 m (1890 ft)

Administration
- France
- Overseas country: French Polynesia

Demographics
- Population: 0 (2024)
- Pop. density: 0/km^{2} (0/sq mi)

Eiao is the largest of the extreme northwestern Marquesas Islands. The island is uninhabited, but is administratively part of the commune (municipality) of Nuku-Hiva, itself in the administrative subdivision of the Marquesas Islands.

As of 2022, the only settlement on the island is a small shelter on the north coast of Vaithua Bay with a water tap. There are some small artificial structures in the north of the island, most likely for archeological purposes. There is a small shrine of Mother Mary somewhere along a trail to the plateau at the top of the island.

== Geography ==
Geographical map of Eiao

Eiao is a remnant of a caldera wall in a 5 million-year-old volcano, which measured 25 km (16 mi). The island is a 12 km (7.5 mi) long and 4 km (2.5 mi) wide crescent shape, measuring 50 square kilometres (12,000 acres).

It is often considered one of the biggest desert islands on earth.

The center of this island is the high Tohuanui plateau, rising on the east side to 576 m (1,890 ft) above sea level, much of which has been devastated by herds of feral sheep and other animals brought here by humans. This plateau is a red desert which covers around 50–60% of the island. The Hanataaitoki Valley is contained in this plateau.

High coastal cliffs border the south side of the island.

The rest of the island is mainly filled with tropical fauna, including coconut and candlenut trees. There is one good anchorage, found on the western side of the island at Vaituha. Another small bay on the southwest side of the island is Opituha Bay. On the northwest side of the island, a sheltered bay known as Charner Bay is located.

== History ==
=== Pre-European ===
In pre-European times, the bodies of chiefs from parts of Te I'i were taken to Eiao for burial.

Eiao was once home to a Marquesan tribe called the Tuametaki. Archaeological investigations have discovered workshops for the production of stone tools, especially adzes, made from local basalt. These tools have been found in archaeological sites on other islands as far as Kiribati, providing evidence for prehistoric inter-island voyaging within this island group. In sites around Polynesia, it was estimated that around 50% of adzes came from Eiao at the peak. Broken adzes and unused chips of basalt were found all across the southern part of the island and plateau. Much of the production settlements were located along the northern plateau, primarily in the Hanataaitoki valley. This settlement included 5 housing sites, and many industrial tools and stations, all suspected to be from about the 14th–17th centuries. The island's population during this era is estimated to have been between 600 and 900 people.

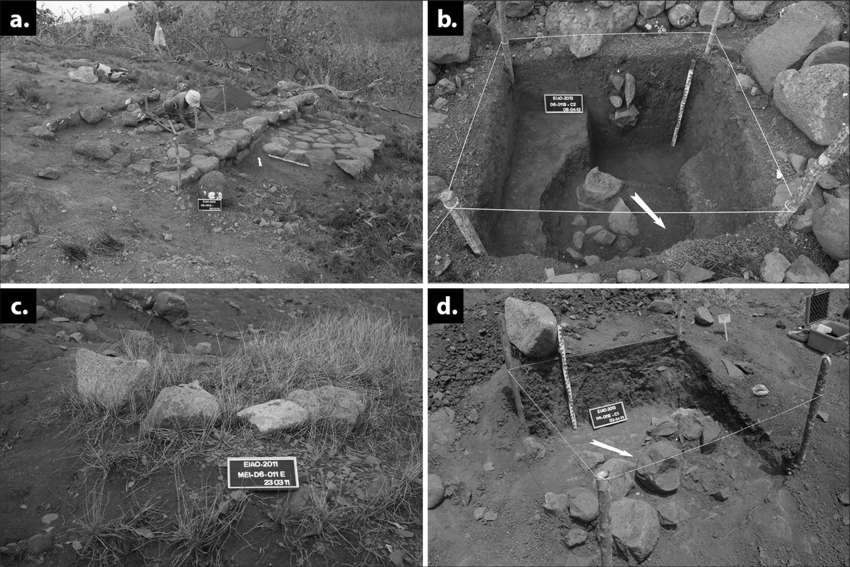
Eiao Excavation Sites

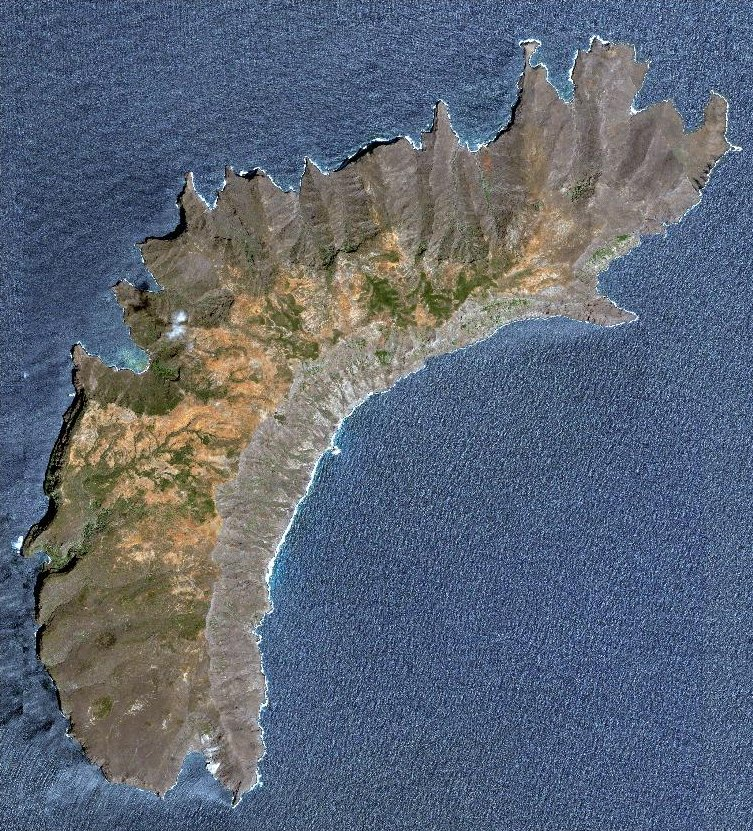
Eiao island from above.

=== Post-European Contact ===
The first non-Polynesian encounter with the island was in 1791 by the American sea captain Joseph Ingraham, who named it Knox Island in honour of Henry Knox, then US Secretary of War. Other names given to this island by Western explorers include Masse, Fremantle, and Robert. The island was uninhabited at the time of its "discovery" by Europeans.

In the late 19th century, the island was briefly used as a leper colony island. However, that enterprise was eventually abandoned due to frequent droughts and the difficulty of reliably landing supplies on the island. From 1962 to 1963, Georges de Caunes lived in a Vaithua bay alone. This was to perform a radio show based on the novel, Robinson Crusoe. This was ended in around 100 days due to health complications. In the 1970s, the island was the site of extensive French military activity, while it was being explored as a possible site for nuclear weapons testing. As of 1972, three drilling operations found the island to be too fragile to withstand testing. In 1992, the Marquesan Nature Reserves were established, creating the Eiao Island Nature Reserve from the island and surrounding area.

This was a first step toward protecting its ecosystem, which includes several endangered species, some of which are endemic. Before the creation of the reserve, the Eiao monarch, a bird in the order passeriformes, became extinct.

In 2010, the Centre International pour la Recherche Archéologique en Polynésie (CIRAP) organized a 50-day research mission to the island to study its archaeological relevance. In May 2022, public consultations began on listing the island as a UNESCO World Heritage Site.

Oral traditions and legends about the island include a story of a Peruvian treasure hidden there by some Spaniards. Other stories tell that during World War II, a German submarine arrived there secretly to hide a Nazi treasure. These stories lack credibility.

== Climate ==
The climate on the island is mainly dry, with little rain throughout the year. Most days are sunny with few clouds. The months of March and April have the most unusual weather.

Climate data for Eiao, French Polynesia
Month	Jan	Feb	Mar	Apr	May	Jun	Jul	Aug	Sep	Oct	Nov	Dec	Year
Mean daily maximum °F (°C)	74 (23)	74 (23)	75 (24)	75 (24)	75 (24)	74 (23)	73 (23)	73 (23)	73 (23)	73 (23)	73 (23)	74 (23)	74 (23)
Mean daily minimum °F (°C)	72 (22)	73 (23)	73 (23)	74 (23)	73 (23)	73 (23)	72 (22)	71 (22)	71 (22)	71 (22)	72 (22)	72 (22)	72 (22)
Average precipitation inches (mm)	2.0 (51)	2.5 (64)	4.8 (120)	4.3 (110)	2.0 (51)	1.4 (36)	0.6 (15)	0.5 (13)	0.3 (7.6)	0.4 (10)	0.3 (7.6)	0.4 (10)	19.5 (495.2)
Source: Meteoblue.com "Records and Averages for Eiao". Web: .

== See also ==
- Hatutu
- Motu One
- Marquesan Nature Reserves
