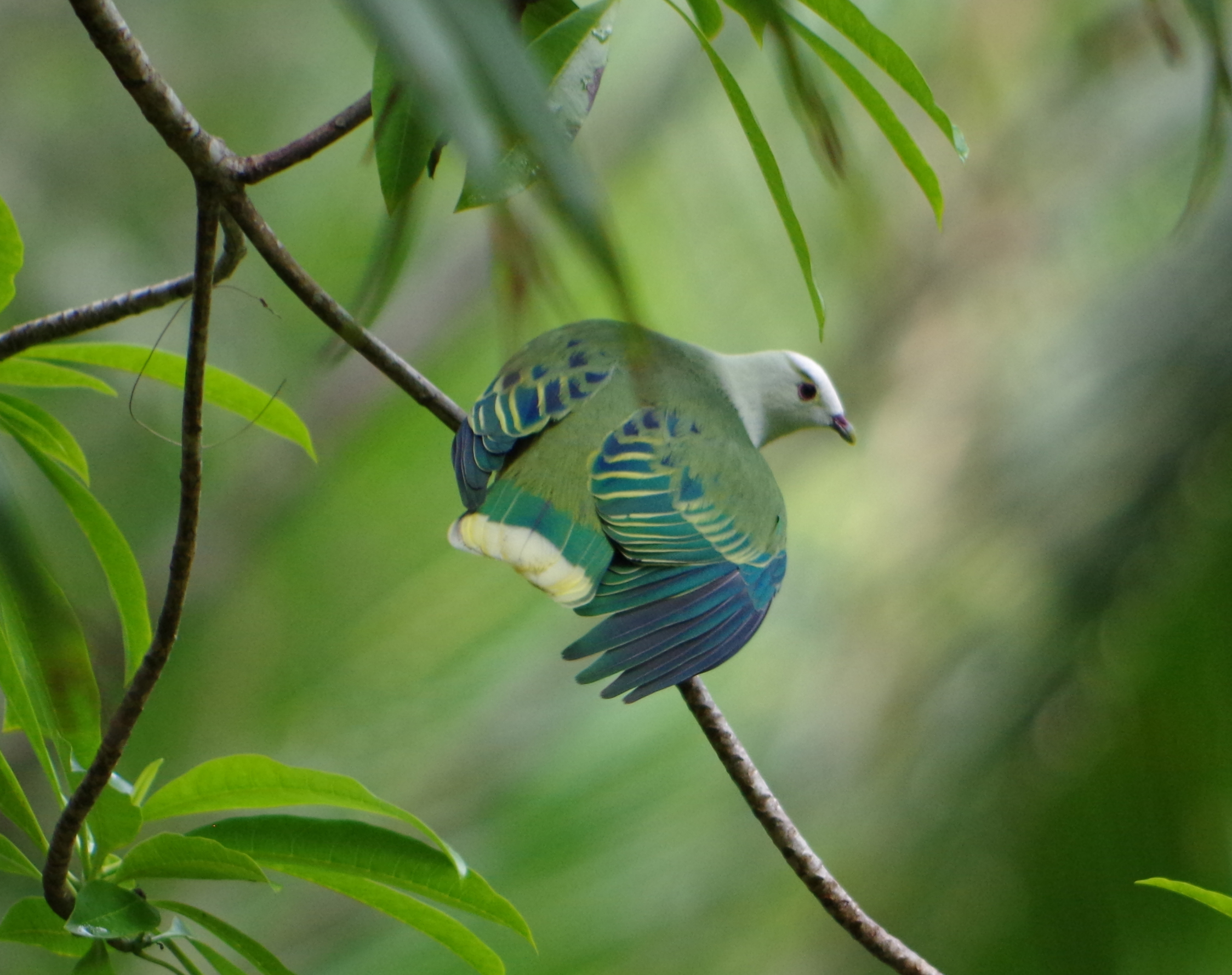

Conservation status
- Least Concern (IUCN 3.1)

Scientific classification
- Kingdom: Animalia
- Phylum: Chordata
- Class: Aves
- Order: Columbiformes
- Family: Columbidae
- Genus: Ptilinopus
- Species: P. dupetithouarsii

Binomial name
- Ptilinopus dupetithouarsii (Neboux, 1840)

= White-capped fruit dove =

Species of bird

The white-capped fruit dove (Ptilinopus dupetithouarsii), also called kuku locally, is a species of bird in the family Columbidae. It was described by French naturalist and surgeon Adolphe-Simon Neboux in 1840. It is endemic to the Marquesas Islands in French Polynesia. The name honours French admiral and botanist Abel Aubert du Petit-Thouars. Two subspecies exist on the islands, Ptilinopus d. dupetithouarsii and Ptilinopus d. viridior.

== Taxonomy ==
The genus name Ptilinopus comes from the ancient Greek πτιλον (ptilon) and πους (pous), which means feathered feet. This refers to the presence of feathers on the tarsi of many species that are part of this genus. The name dupetithouarsii honours French admiral and botanist Abel Aubert du Petit-Thouars (1793–1864) who had for mission to take possession of the Marquesas Islands for France. His mission was successful when in 1841 he took control of the islands and established a French protectorate.

== Description ==
The white-capped fruit dove is a colourful bird with greenish wings that are marked with blue patches. Their belly is yellow but presents a bright red and orange patch at the middle point of their body; the yellow colours seem to get more vibrant towards the underside of their tail. Their throat is yellow with the same kind of tints as their belly. As their name suggests, they have a lighter white crown that extends all the way to their beak. Right under their crown and next to their eyes, they have a colourful line that extends from the eye ring to the back of their head which can be yellow or darker. The eye ring appears to be orange. The rest of the plumage shows less colours with the presence of more beige or greyish feathers.

Their body mass is around 100g and their wing length is close to 14.5 cm.

== Evolution and phylogeny ==
=== Speciation on the Marquesas Islands ===
The white-capped fruit dove had a speciation event including a closely related species named the Red-moustached Fruit Dove (Ptilinopus mercierii), which is now extinct. In fact, the two species occupied at least the Nuku Hiva, Ua Huka, and Hiva Oa islands together and shared similar ecological niches which made researchers hypothesize the possibility of a sympatric evolution (evolution occurring without a physical separation) event between the two species. However, a microallopatry speciation is more likely to have occurred between those two species. Microallopatry would explain the divergence of the two species because it was determined that the range within a single island was large enough to allow the separation of the two species spatially. In fact, the volcanic activities that took place from 5 million years ago to 4 million years ago on Nuku Hiva with the presence of calderas volcanoes, would have allowed the separation of the two species of birds while offering enough resources to support multiple species of fruit doves.

== Behaviour ==
=== Vocalization ===
Typical vocalizations of dove with the presence of "coo" sounds that rise in pitch and then get lower pitched. They are described as "mournful" sounding. The white-capped fruit dove produces long and slow vocalizations at first that can accelerate and get shorter as the call goes on.

=== Diet ===
White-capped fruit doves are frugivores. They feed mostly on fruits, but can also forage for seeds. They have been observed foraging on the forest soil for fallen fruits. They prefer berries to other sources of food that can be found on the islands. Compared to other granivorous species, the diet of white-capped fruit doves forces them to have lower metabolic rates and behaviours that require lower energy costs.

=== Reproduction ===
In general, fruit doves are known to produce single egg clutches. The squabs are altricial and require parental care to mature. Like other columbids species, both parents are known to incubate the eggs and care for the hatchlings by producing crop milk (also called "pigeon milk").

Little is known about the reproduction of the white-capped fruit dove. However, the reproduction of species of the same genus has been explored (for example the Jambu fruit doves, Ptilinopus jambu). Birds of the genus Ptilinopus show more parental care from the female which spends the day only feeding while the males feed and brood the squabs. The females then take over and brood in the evening, at night, and in the morning until the male starts brooding again. The rates of feeding and brooding are lower in fruit doves compared to seed eating columbidae. Many factors would explain this like the lower metabolic rates of fruit doves, the content of the crop milk and the single egg clutches.

== Habitat and distribution ==
=== Habitat ===
They prefer forested habitats where there is the presence of fruiting plants. They have been found sitting next to trees called banyans. They often move from areas where there is an absence of fruits and flowers to areas where there is a higher concentration of food sources, often by traversing mountain passes. It is rare to observe fruit doves in the wild because of their preference for denser forests.

=== Distribution ===
The white–capped fruit dove is an endemic species of French Polynesia. It can be found on the group of islands named Marquesas Islands. For the subspecies Ptilinopus d. dupetithouarsii, it can be found on the islands Hiva Oa, Tahuata, Mohotani and Fatuhiva, the more southern islands of the archipelago. For Ptilinopus d. viridior, it can be found on the islands Nuku Hiva, Ua Huka and Ua Pou which are the northern islands.

== Conservation ==
Although the white-capped fruit dove was declared of least concern of extinct by the IUCN redlist, some studies explored the potential for extinction of species endemic to islands. The paleoecological data showed that endemism, body size and diet are important factors in the extinction risks of bird species. The white-capped fruit dove was determined to be a false-positive, a species with high extinction risk that might be considered of least concerned because of its high resiliency or conservation measures. For the future, further studies to assess wildlife management and conservation measures might be needed in order to keep the species away from extinction.

On Tathuata island, the populations of white-capped fruit dove have been declining because of the introduction of the great horned owl.
