= Hatutu Nature Reserve =

Nature reserve in French Polynesia

Coordinates: 7.918°S 140.572°W

The Hatutu Nature Reserve is a nature reserve encompassing the whole of the island of Hatutu in the northern Marquesas Islands. The reserve was declared in 1971, and is the primary nesting site of several endangered species, several of which are endemic, including the Hatutu Marquesan warbler (Acrocephalus mendanae postremus) and the Marquesas ground dove (Gallicolumba rubescens). The Hatutu Nature Reserve is home to one of the most important nesting grounds for the blue-footed booby (Sula nebouxii).

== See also ==
- French Polynesia
- Marquesan Nature Reserves
