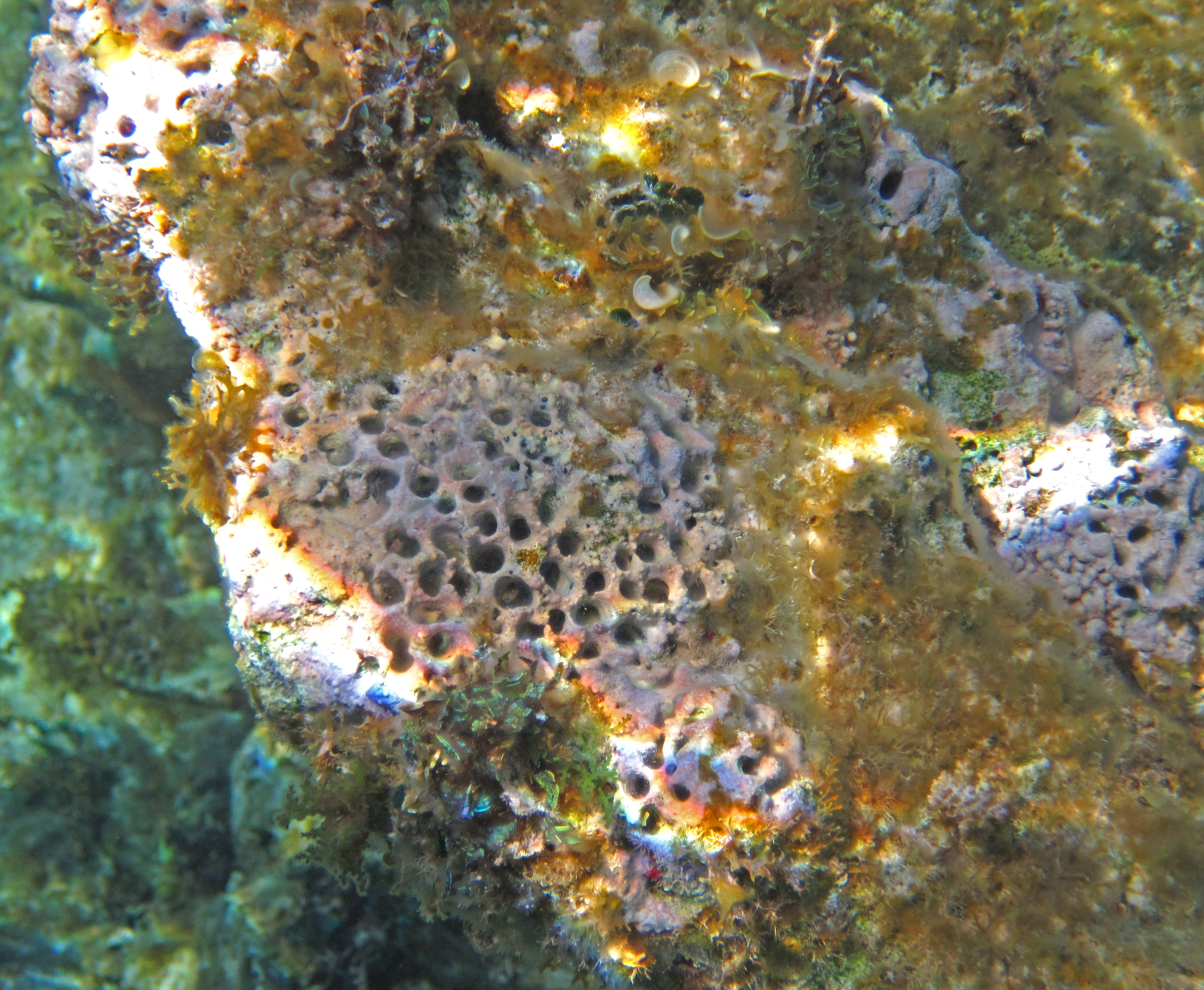
- Porolithon antillarum

Scientific classification
- Domain: Eukaryota
- Clade: Archaeplastida
- Division: Rhodophyta
- Class: Florideophyceae
- Order: Corallinales
- Family: Porolithaceae
- Subfamily: Porolithoideae
- Genus: Porolithon; Foslie, 1909

Type species
- Porolithon onkodes (Heydrich) Foslie, 1909

= Porolithon =

Genus of algae

Porolithon is a genus of coralline red algae. Porolithon are the primary reef building algae. When coral reefs reach sea level, many corals break under the high energy impact of the waves, while coralline red algae, primarily Porolithon, continuing building and cementing the reef structure.

== Taxonomy ==
Porolithon was a member of the family Corallinaceae until 2018 when it was moved into a new family Porolithaceae. The genus currently comprises 24 species, although more have been recently proposed based on genomic analyses.

The type species of this genus, Porolithon onkodes, was originally described in 1897 as Lithothamnion onkodes by Franz Heydrich, but subsequently moved to Porolithon in 1909.

== Species ==
Accepted species in the genus are:

- Porolithon aequinoctiale (Foslie) Foslie
- Porolithon antillarum (Foslie & M.Howe) Foslie & M.Howe
- Porolithon castellum E.Y.Dawson
- Porolithon colliculosum Masaki
- Porolithon imitatum R.A.Townsend & G.W.Saunders
- Porolithon improcerum (Foslie & M.Howe) M.Howe
- Porolithon maneveldtii R.A.Townsend & Huisman
- Porolithon marshallense W.R.Taylor
- Porolithon oligocarpum (Foslie) W.H.Adey
- Porolithon onkodes (Heydrich) Foslie
- Porolithon penroseae R.A.Townsend & P.W.Gabrielson
- Porolithon praetextatum (Foslie) Foslie
- Porolithon sandvicense (Foslie) Foslie
- Porolithon sonorense E.Y.Dawson
