= Motane Nature Reserve =

Nature reserve in French Polynesia

Motane One Reserve
- Interactive map of Motane One Reserve
- Location: Marquesas Islands
- Coordinates: 9.986°S 138.829°W
- Established: 1992

The Motane One Reserve is a nature reserve containing the whole of the islands of Moho Tani and Terihi, as well as the surrounding rocks, in the southern Marquesas Islands. It was declared in 1992, as the first step toward protecting the ecosystem, much of which, on Moho Tani, has been destroyed by over-grazing by feral sheep, pigs and goats. Terihi and the smaller rocks are home to large seabird rookeries. The island and its ecological disaster is mentioned by Thor Heyerdahl in his book Green Was the Earth on the Seventh Day.

== See also ==
- French Polynesia
- Marquesan Nature Reserves
