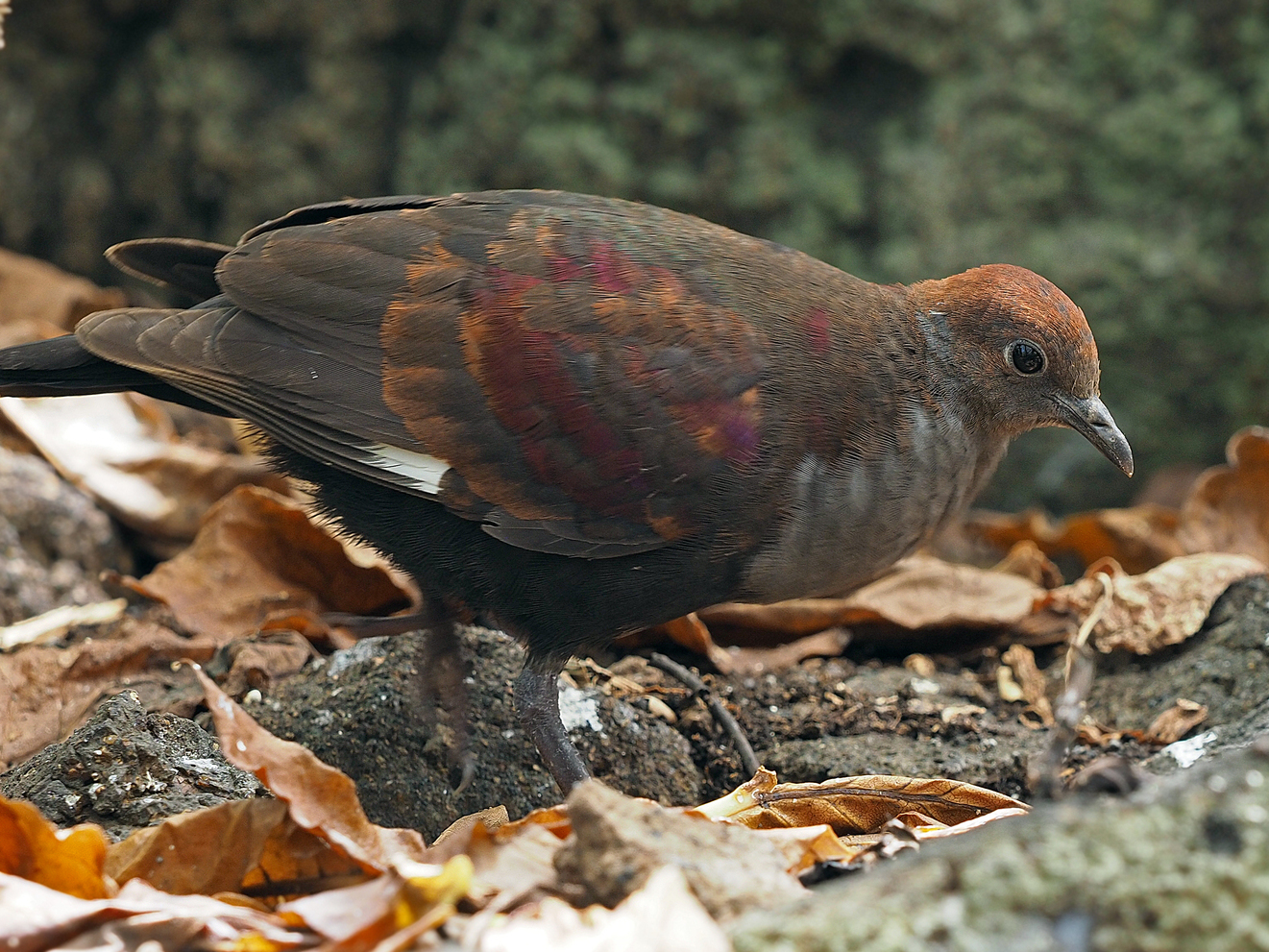

Conservation status
- Endangered (IUCN 3.1)

Scientific classification
- Kingdom: Animalia
- Phylum: Chordata
- Class: Aves
- Order: Columbiformes
- Family: Columbidae
- Genus: Pampusana
- Species: P. rubescens

Binomial name
- Pampusana rubescens (Vieillot, 1818)

Synonyms
- Columba rubescens Vieillot, 1818; Gallicolumba rubescens; Alopecoenas rubescens

= Marquesan ground dove =

Species of bird

The Marquesan ground dove or Marquesas ground dove (Pampusana rubescens) is a bird species in the family Columbidae. It is endemic to French Polynesia. Its natural habitats are subtropical or tropical dry forests and subtropical or tropical moist shrubland.

It is currently classified as endangered by the IUCN.

This species was formerly in the genus Alopecoenas Sharpe, 1899, but the name of the genus was changed in 2019 to Pampusana Bonaparte, 1855 as this name has priority.
