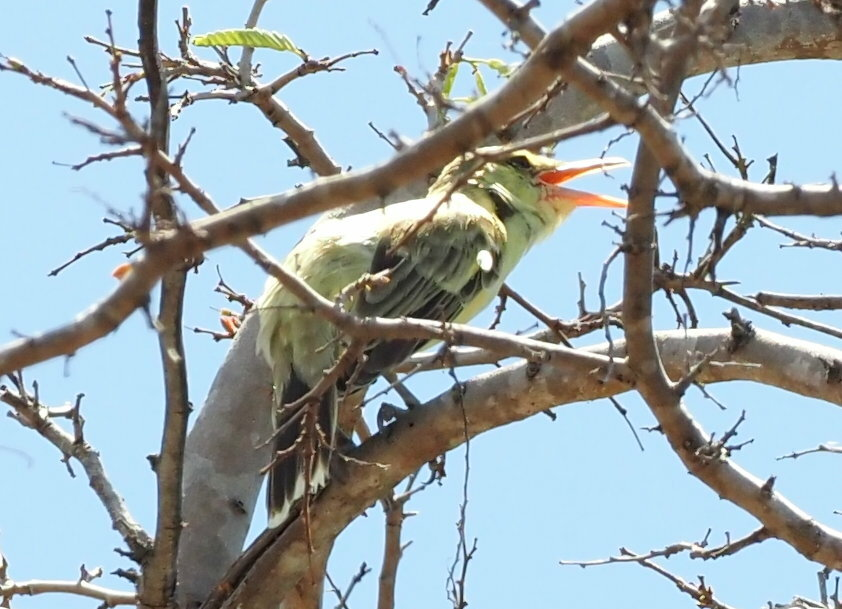

Conservation status
- Least Concern (IUCN 3.1)

Scientific classification
- Kingdom: Animalia
- Phylum: Chordata
- Class: Aves
- Order: Passeriformes
- Family: Acrocephalidae
- Genus: Acrocephalus
- Species: A. percernis

Binomial name
- Acrocephalus percernis (Wetmore, 1919)
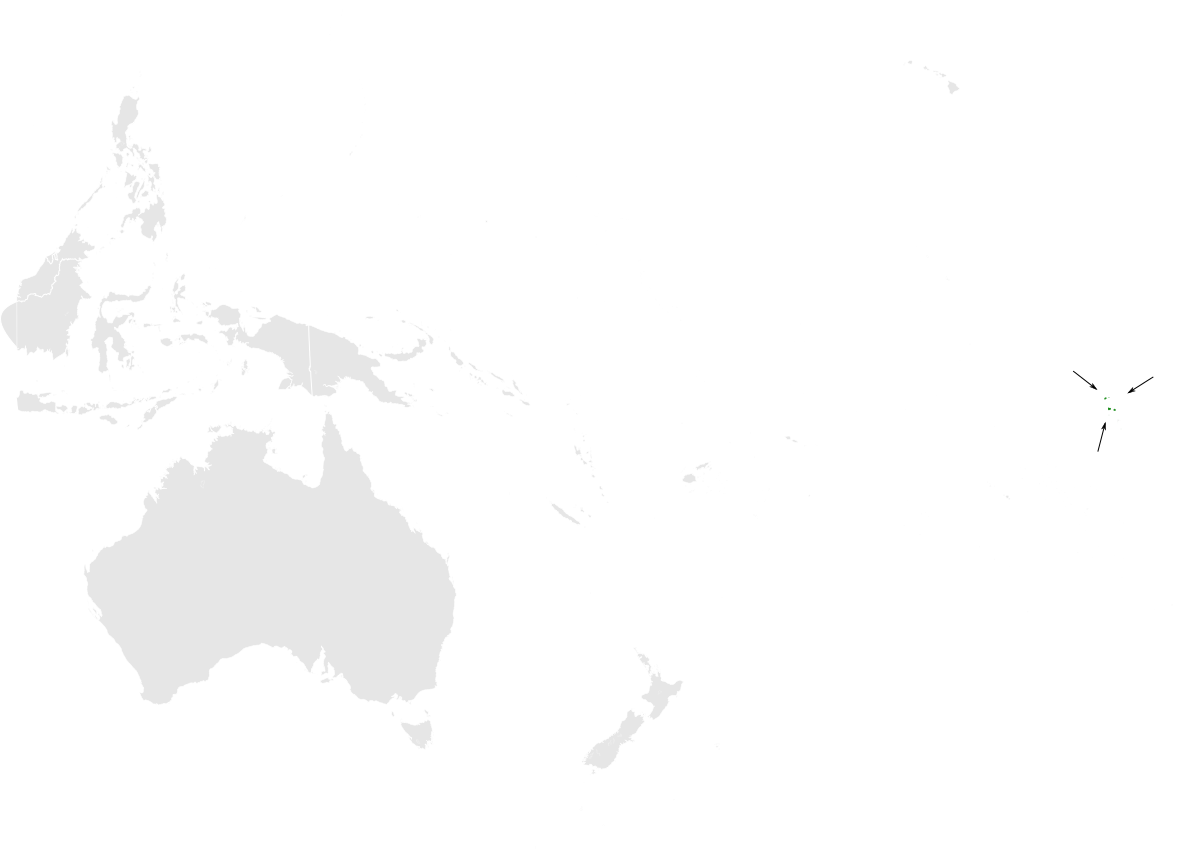

= Northern Marquesan reed warbler =

Species of bird

The northern Marquesan reed warbler (Acrocephalus percernis) is a species of Old World warbler in the family Acrocephalidae. It was formerly considered conspecific with the southern Marquesan reed warbler, and together known as the Marquesan reed warbler. It is found on the northern Marquesas Islands.
