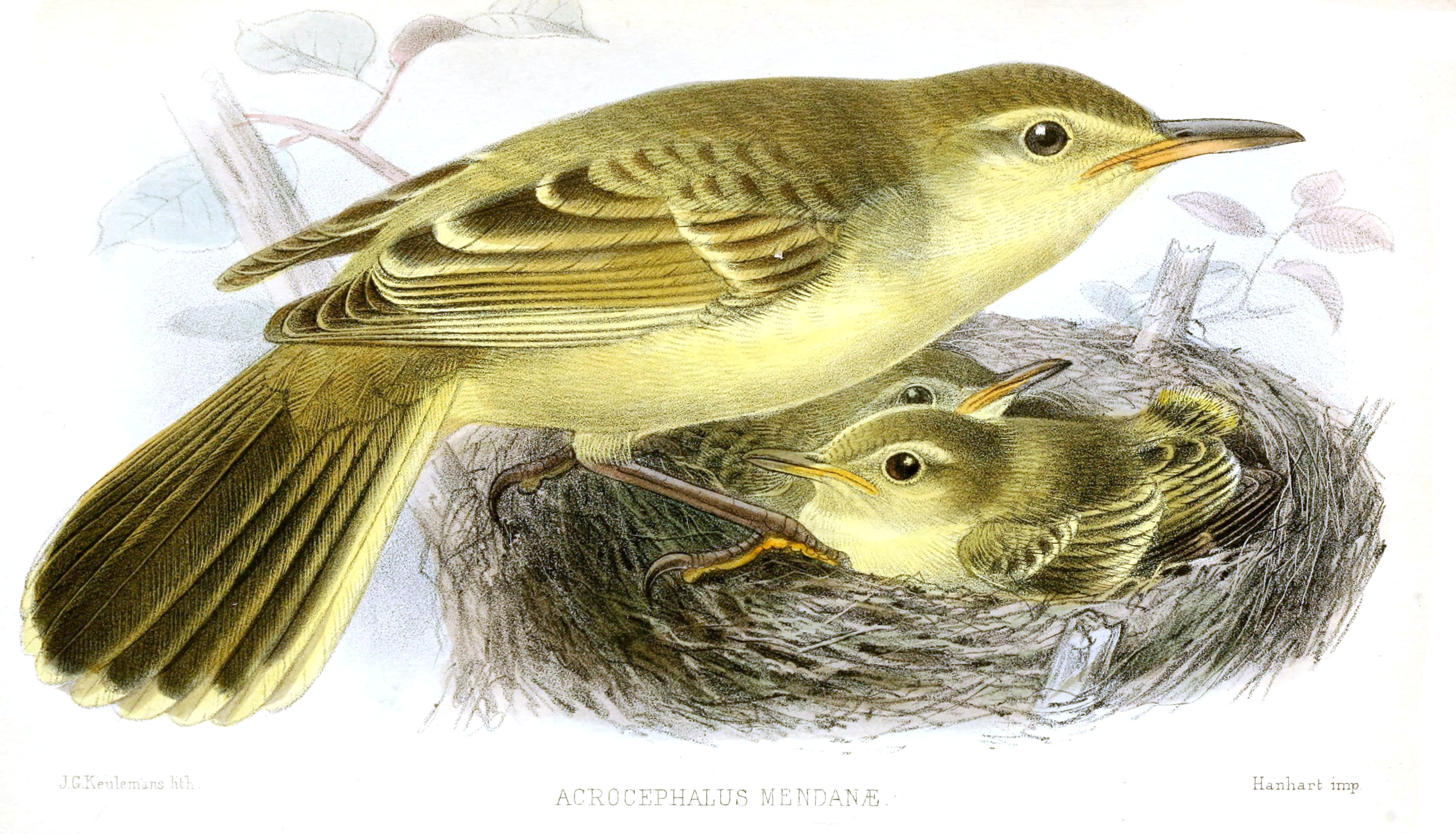

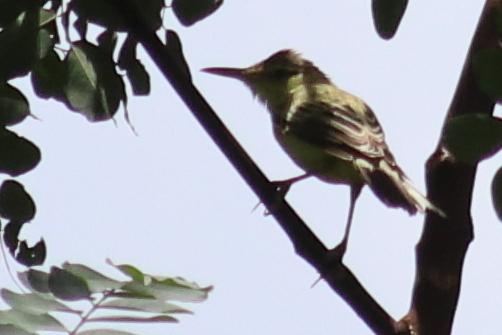

Conservation status
- Least Concern (IUCN 3.1)

Scientific classification
- Kingdom: Animalia
- Phylum: Chordata
- Class: Aves
- Order: Passeriformes
- Family: Acrocephalidae
- Genus: Acrocephalus
- Species: A. mendanae

Binomial name
- Acrocephalus mendanae Tristram, 1883
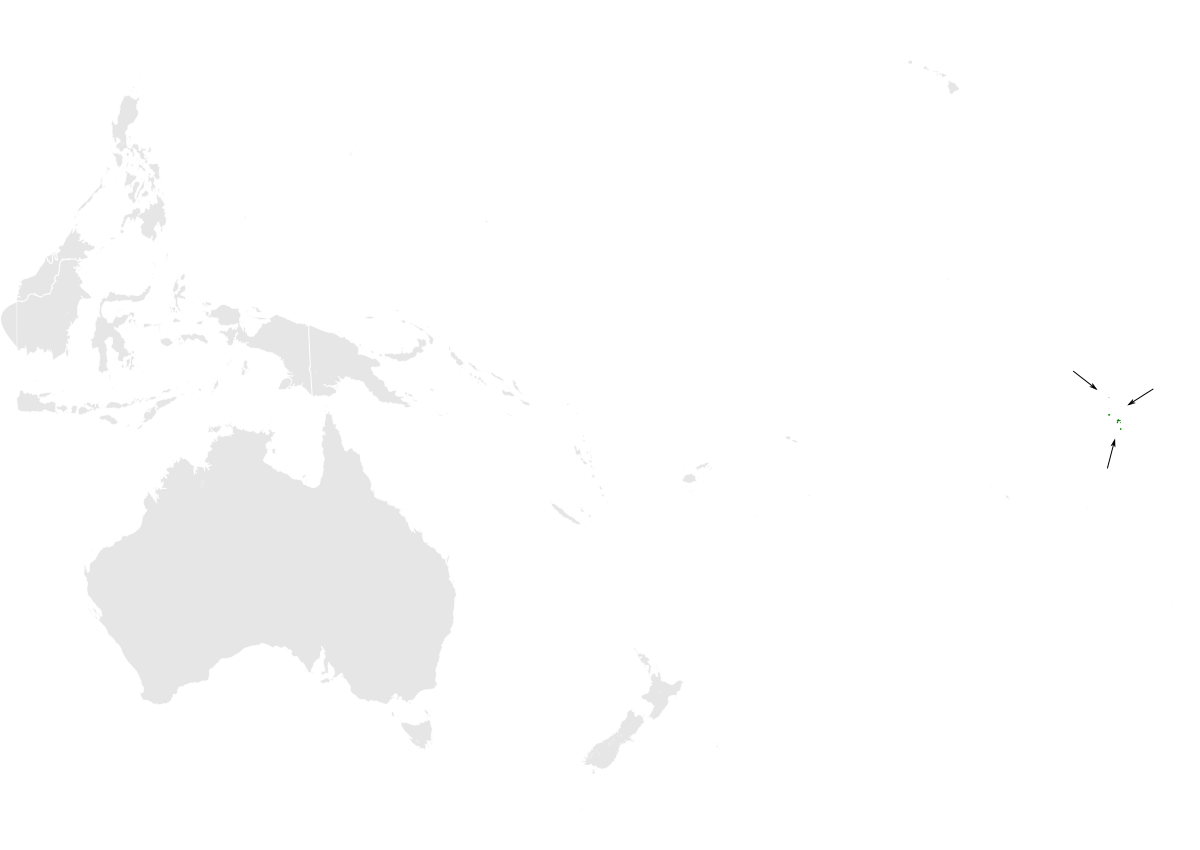

= Southern Marquesan reed warbler =

Species of bird

The southern Marquesan reed warbler (Acrocephalus mendanae) is a species of Old World warbler in the family Acrocephalidae.

It was formerly considered conspecific with the northern Marquesan reed warbler, and together known as the Marquesan reed warbler.

It is found only on the southern Marquesan Islands.

Subspecies include:

- Uapou Marquesan warbler, Acrocephalus mendanae dido
- nominate (Hiva Oa, Tahuata), Acrocephalus mendanae mendanae
- Mohotani Marquesan warbler, Acrocephalus mendanae consobrina
- Fatuhiva Marquesan warbler, Acrocephalus mendanae fatuhivae
