= Îles Nuageuses =

Islands in the French Southern and Antarctic Lands

- Location within Kerguelen

Geography
- Location: Near Loranchet Peninsula
- Coordinates: 48°38′S 68°39′E
- Archipelago: Kerguelen
- Total islands: 5
- Major islands: Île de Croÿ, Île du Roland
- Area: 16 km^{2} (6.2 sq mi)
- Length: 3 km (1.9 mi)
- Width: 7 km (4.3 mi)
- Highest elevation: 518 m (1699 ft)
- Highest point: Pic de l'île de Croÿ

Administration
- France
- Zone: French Southern and Antarctic Lands

Demographics
- Population: Uninhabited

The Îles Nuageuses (French pronunciation: [il nɥaʒøz]; Cloudy Islands in English, named so because of their climate) comprise a group of small islands that are part of the Kerguelen archipelago, a French territory in the southern Indian Ocean. They are an important breeding spot for seabirds, especially penguins and albatrosses, and for fur seals.

The islands are free of introduced species and are thus covered in dense subantarctic vegetation up to about 200 m. Human visitors are rare.

== Geography ==
The group is located in the northwestern area of the archipelago. It lies about 15 kilometres (9.3 miles) north-west, across the Jean-Baptiste Charcot Channel, from the tip of the Loranchet Peninsula, the northernmost extension of Grande Terre, the principal island of the Kerguelens. The islands are of volcanic origin.

The main islands of the Nuageuses are Île de Croÿ, Île du Roland, Île d’Après and the Îles Ternay, with the small Île Clugny some 12 kilometres (7.5 miles) to the south of the others. Far to the north lies the Îlot du Rendez-vous. The highest point in the group is just over 500 m above sea level and the coastlines are mainly sheer cliffs.

There is one lake on the archipelago, Lac Claudine, measuring 400 sq m.

== History ==
The îles Nuageuses were first sighted during Yves Joseph de Kerguelen de Trémarec's second expedition in 1773. They were so named after the frequently mist-covered tops of their cliffs and were referred to as the Cloudy Isles by James Cook in 1776.

== Important Bird Area ==
The Îles Nuageuses, including Île Clugny, have been identified as a 240 km^{2} Important Bird Area (IBA) by BirdLife International. At least 25 bird species breed on the islands. Penguins include 7500 pairs of gentoos, 35,000 pairs of northern rockhoppers and up to 50,000 pairs of macaronis. There are 1800 pairs of black-browed, 7800 pairs of grey-headed, 50 pairs of Indian yellow-nosed, about five pairs of wandering and some light-mantled albatrosses. Other birds breeding on the islands include Antarctic prions, Kerguelen, white-chinned, Wilson's storm and common diving petrels, as well as black-faced sheathbills. There are also small numbers of northern giant petrels, Kerguelen shags, Eaton's pintails and Kerguelen terns.

There is a large breeding colony of Antarctic fur seals as well.

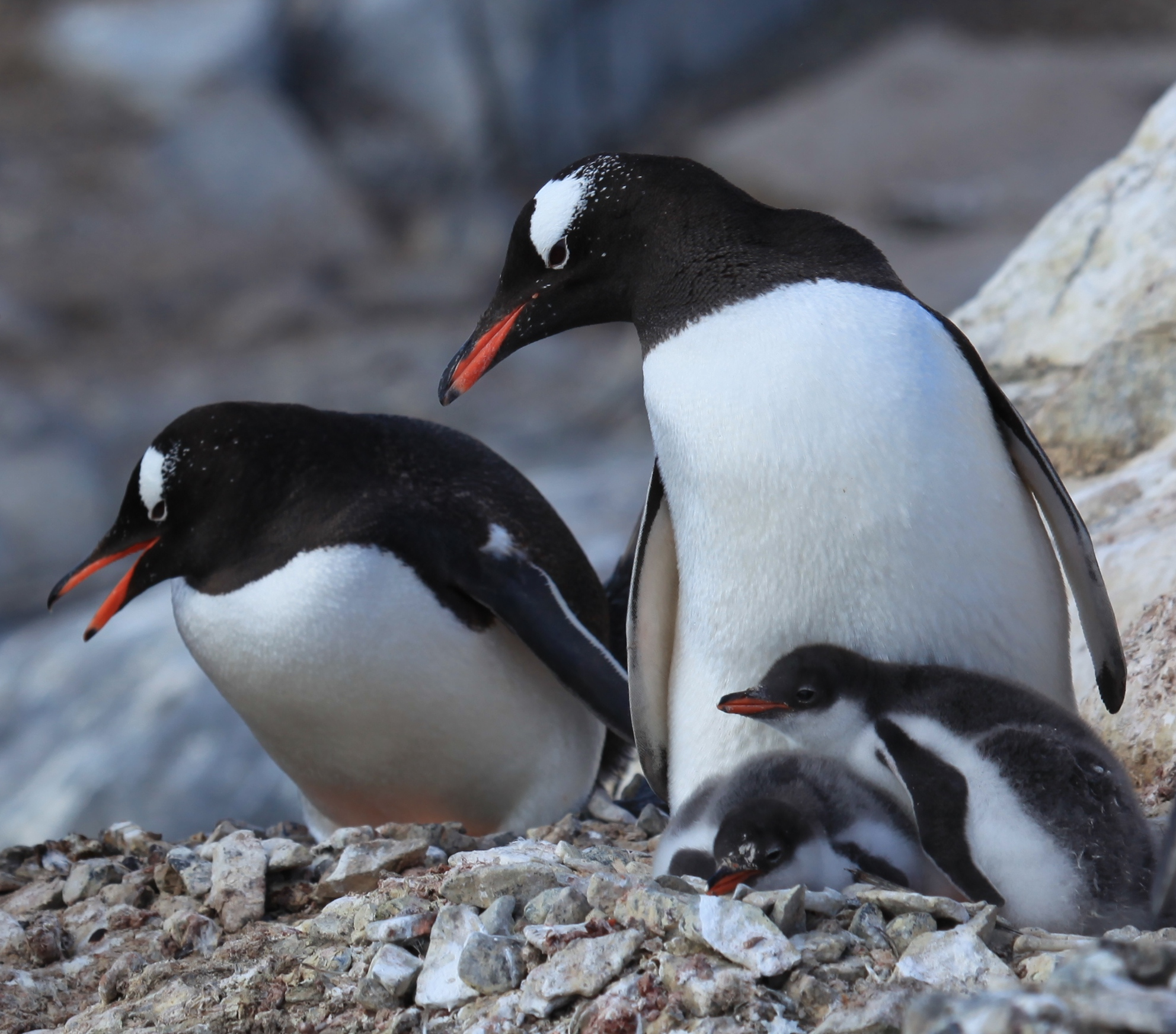
The islands are an important breeding site for gentoo penguins

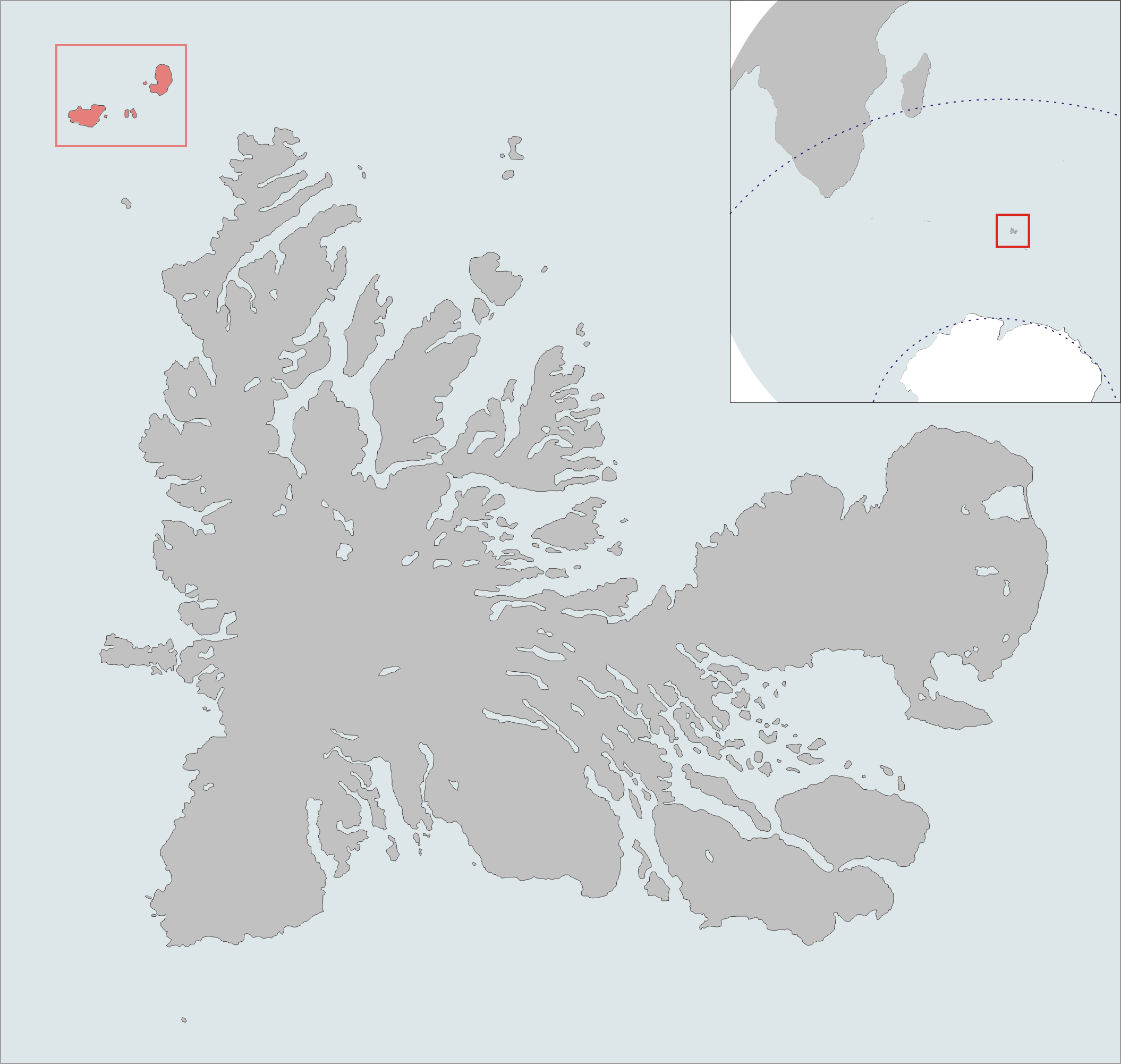
Îles Nuageuses and location in the Indian Ocean
