= Île Australia =

Native name: Île Australia
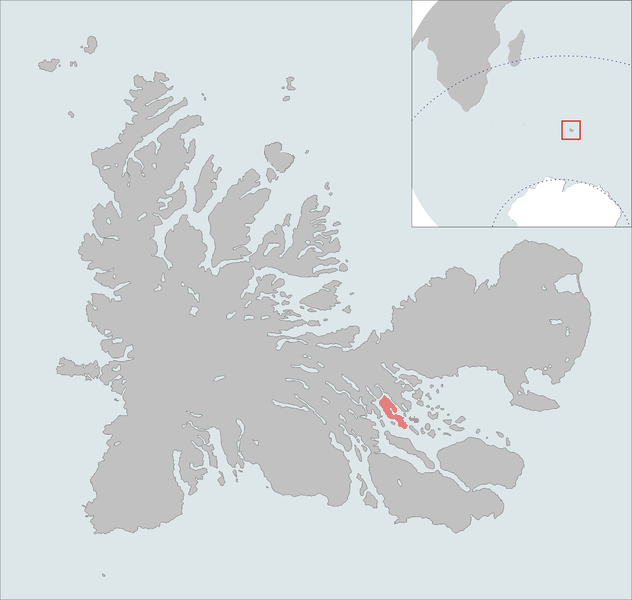
- The Île Australia is highlighted on this Kerguelen Islands map.
- Interactive map of Île Australia

Geography
- Location: Indian Ocean
- Coordinates: 49°27′S 69°50′E
- Archipelago: Îles Kerguelen
- Area: 37 km^{2} (14 sq mi)
- Length: 10 km (6 mi)
- Width: 3 km (1.9 mi)
- Coastline: 32 km (19.9 mi)
- Highest elevation: 145 m (476 ft).
- Highest point: Le stack de Tome

Administration
- France
- District: Îles Kerguelen

Demographics
- Population: 0

Île Australia is one of the Kerguelen Islands situated in the Golfe du Morbihan near the coast of Grande Terre, the principal island.

It is around 10 km long and 3 km wide. The highest spot is Le stack de Tome at 145 metres.
