= Lake Armor =

Lake in France

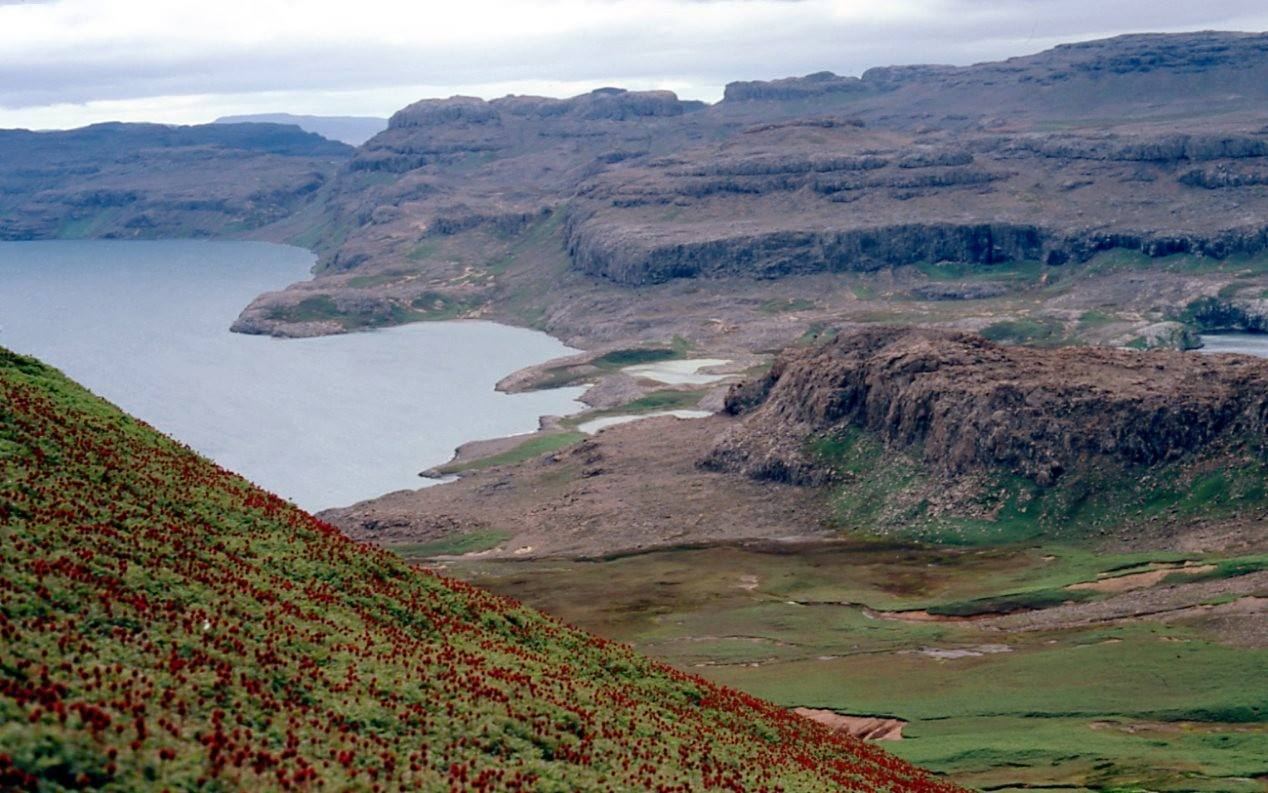

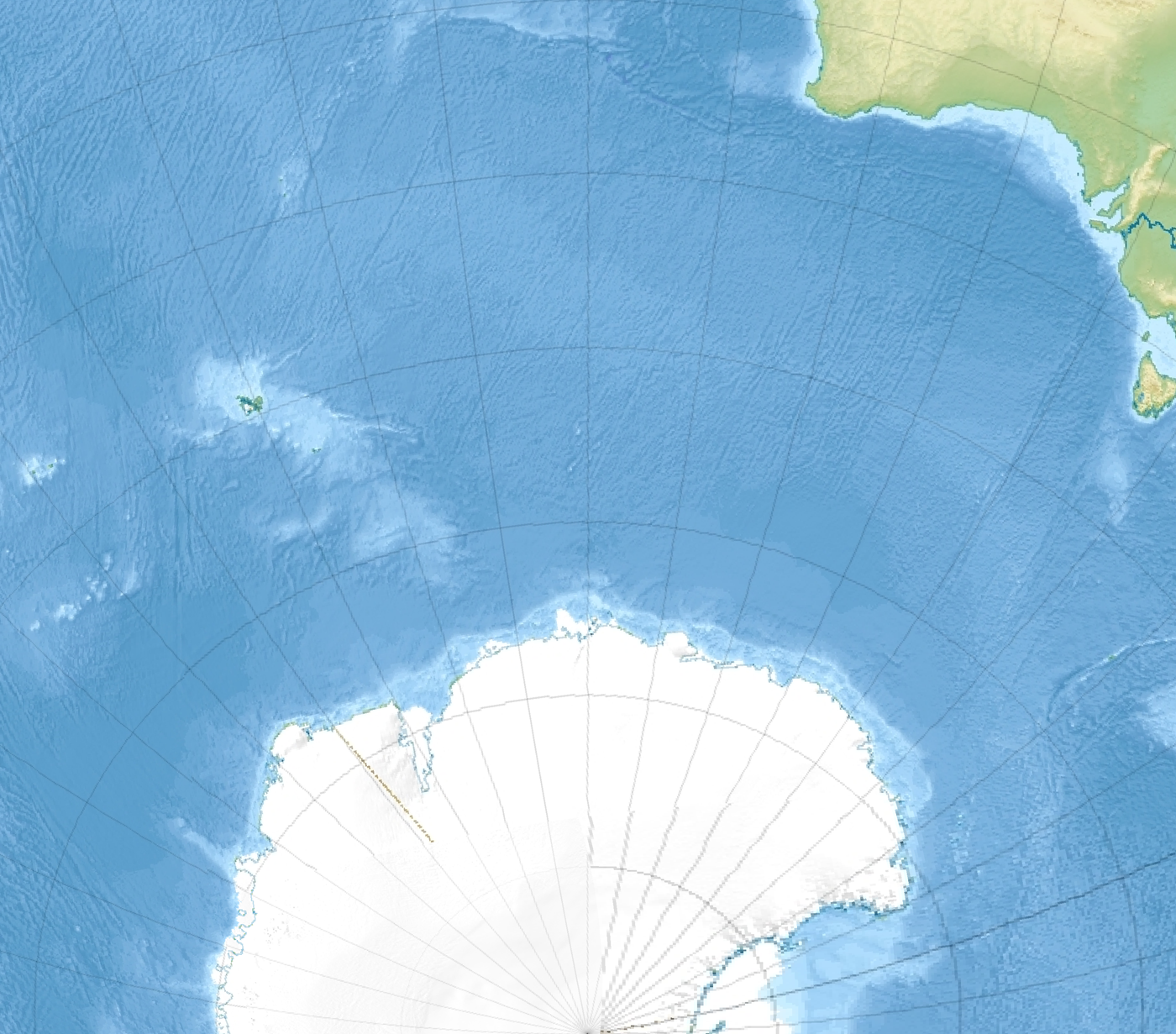
- Location within Subantarctic (Indian Ocean)
- Location: Kerguelen islands, French Southern and Antarctic Lands
- Coordinates: 49°27′17″S 69°42′28″E
- Lake type: Fjord lake
- Primary outflows: Emissaire du Lac Armor
- Basin countries: France
- Max. length: 3.7 km (2.3 mi)
- Max. width: 0.7 km (0.43 mi)
- Surface area: 2 km^{2} (0.77 sq mi)
- Average depth: 98 m (322 ft)
- Max. depth: 98 m (322 ft)
- Water volume: 254,000 m^{3} (9,000,000 cu ft)
- Shore length^{1}: 8.5 km (5.3 mi)
- Surface elevation: 1 m (3 ft 3 in)
- Settlements: Base Armor
- ^{1} Shore length is not a well-defined measure.

Lake Armor is a fjord lake located on the central plateau of the main island of the Kerguelen archipelago, in the French Southern and Antarctic Lands.

It was so named by the Mouzon mission in 1952 after a Breton noun which means "the land close to the sea".

It extends in a northwesterly south-easterly direction at an altitude of about 1 m, over a length of about 3.7 km (2.3 mi) and a maximum width of 700 m (2,300 ft), covering around 200 ha (490 acres). From the south, a stream passing down the Volcan du Diable feeds the lake, having collected the waters coming from the slopes of the volcano as well as those of the Val d'Enfer and the Val des Trolls, and thus their lakes. Another stream feeds the lake from the north. Lake Armor flows into the marine waters of the Gulf of Morbihan in the Hurley Bay.

Near the lake is the only known spot in Kerguelen of Elaphoglossum randii, a small fern endemic to the sub-Antarctic islands of the Indian Ocean, which occurs elsewhere only in the Marion and Prince Edward Islands.

The southern beaches of Lake Armor are also known for their curious little pebbles, rolled by the waves and nicknamed "Armor dicks" because of their evocative shape.

An introduction of salmonids has been achieved between 1977 and 1992 in the Lake Armor and its tributaries. The first release of fry occurred in 1977 with Atlantic salmon (Salmo salar) from Scotland. Such a release was reared in 1978 and 1980. Furthermore, an experiment of salmon farming started in 1984, but this time with Pacific species: mainly Coho salmon (Oncorhynchus kisutch) and also Chinook salmon (Oncorhynchus tshawytscha). After being raised in floating cages in the freshwater of the lake, the smolts were freed expecting they would come back as adults to their nursery place. In order to monitor this experiment a technical base had been built near the outflow of the lake. The experiment stopped in 1991 and the station was then abandoned. In 1991 and 1992, last releases were done with some young fish of other species: brown trout (Salmo trutta), brook trout (Salvelinus fontinalis) from local acclimated populations and Arctic char (Salvelinus alpinus) native to Haute-Savoie.

Sedimentological surveys were carried out from 2007 in the northern part of Lake Armor to collect information on the climate changings for 1200 years.

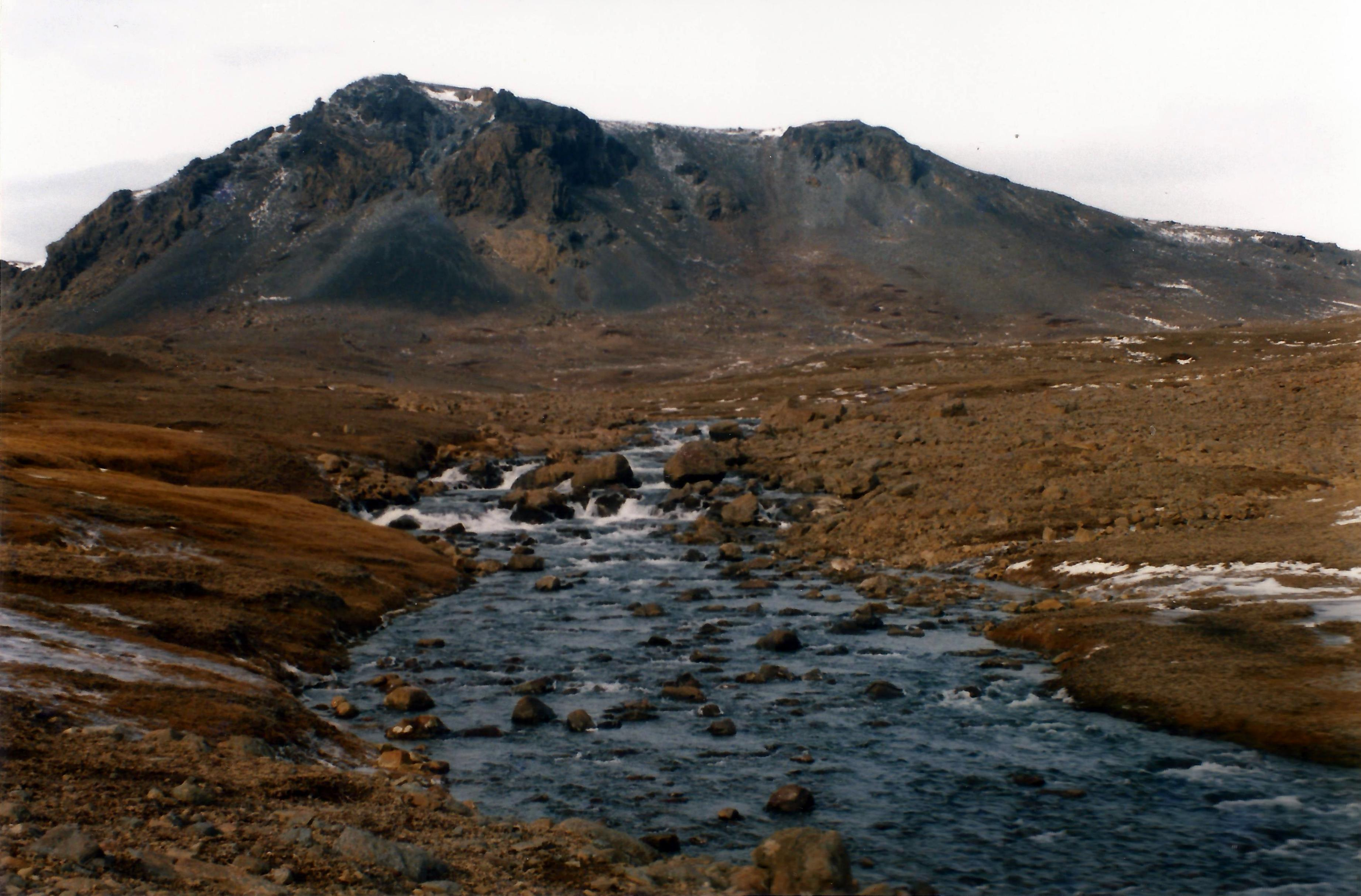
The main feeding stream passes down the volcan du Diable

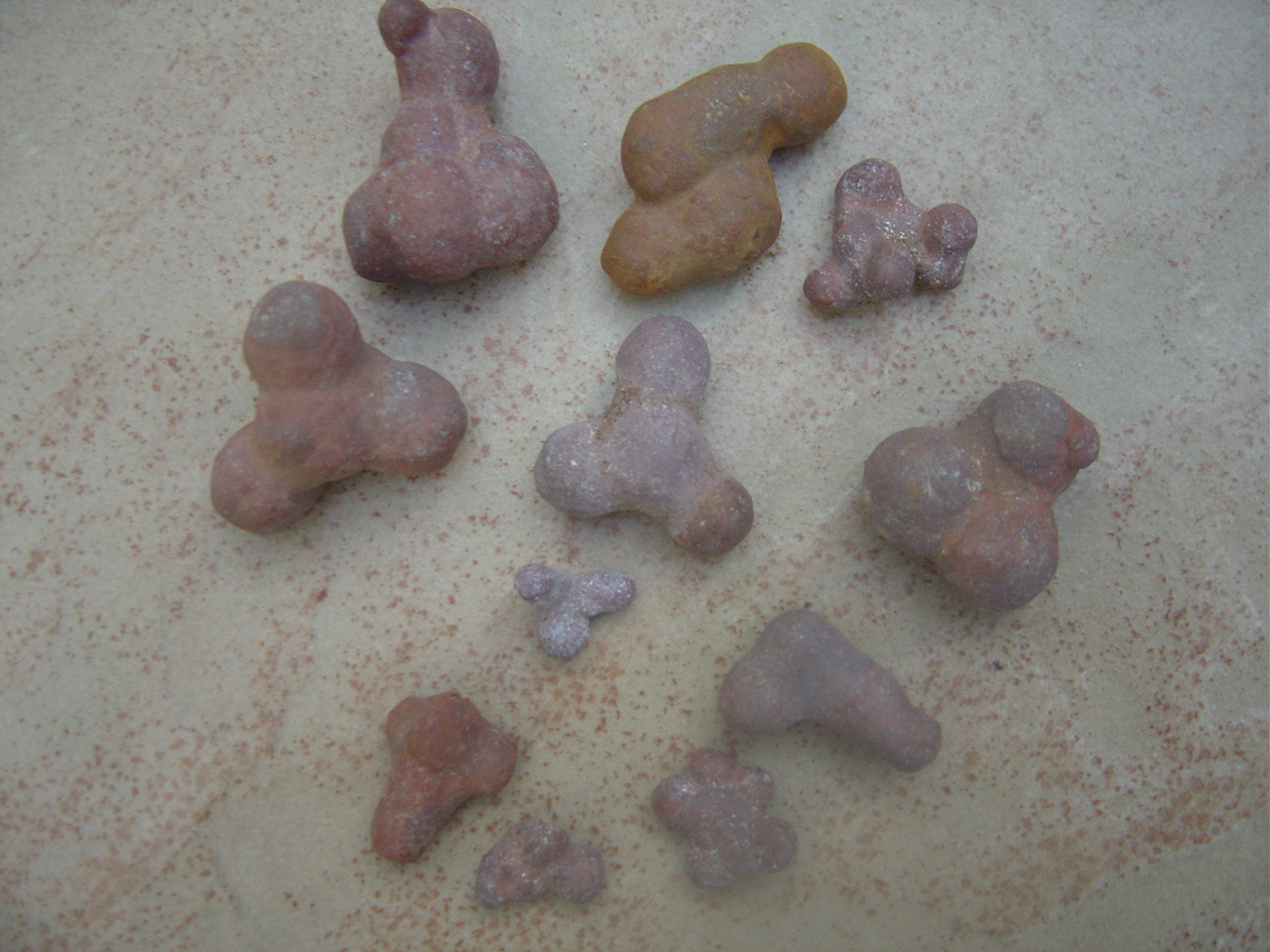
The male genital-shaped pebbles found on the southern beaches of the lake
