= Îles du Prince-de-Monaco =

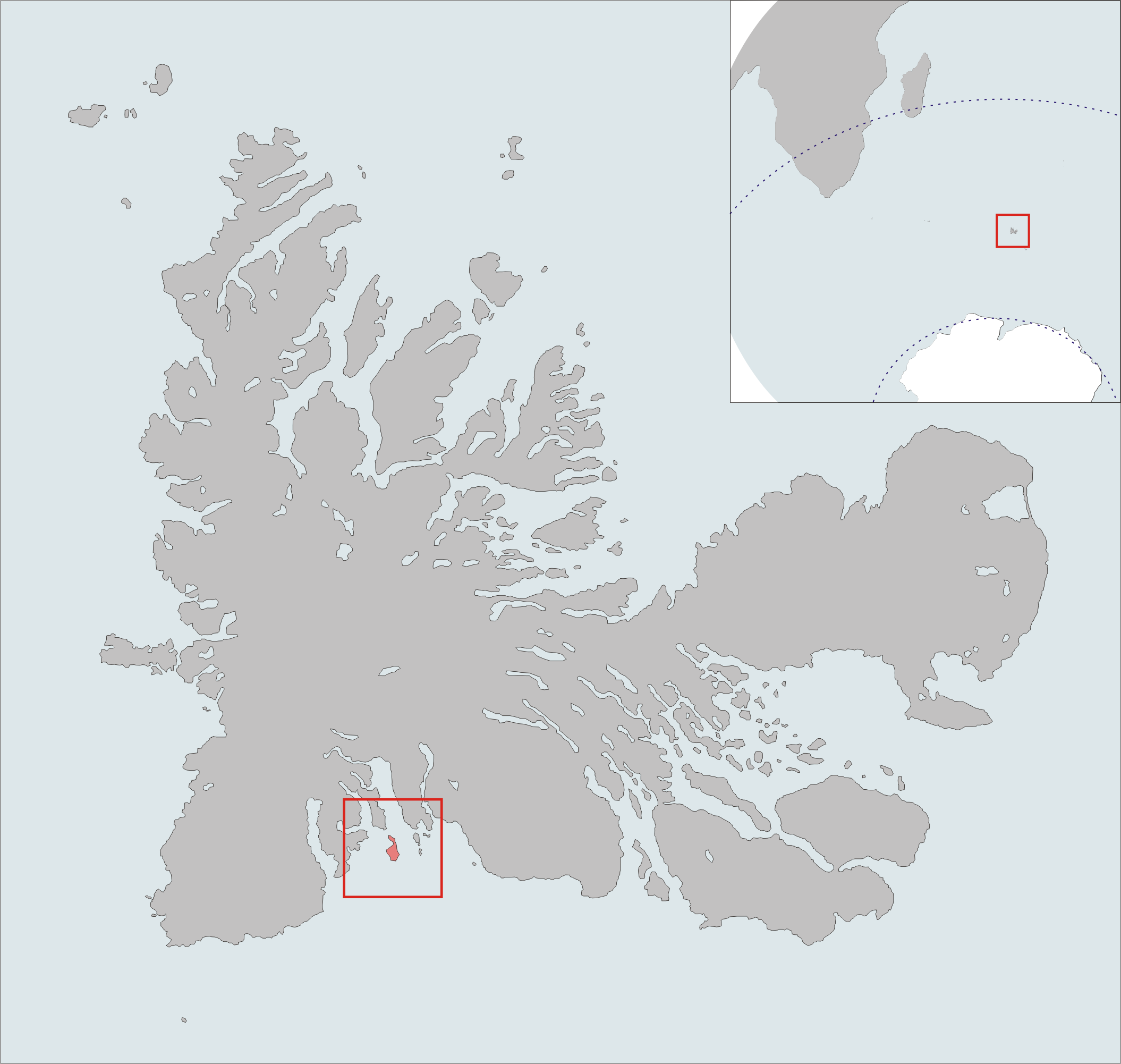
- The isles position is highlighted on this Kerguelen Islands map.
- Interactive map of Îles du Prince-de-Monaco

Geography
- Location: Indian Ocean
- Coordinates: 49°36′S 69°14′E
- Archipelago: Îles Kerguelen
- Total islands: 2
- Major islands: Île Nord du Prince-de-Monaco ,Île Sud du Prince-de-Monaco
- Area: 1 km^{2} (0.39 sq mi)
- Length: 4 km (2.5 mi)
- Width: 2 km (1.2 mi)
- Coastline: 10 km (6 mi)
- Highest elevation: 99 m (325 ft).
- Highest point: Unnamed hill

Administration
- France
- District: Îles Kerguelen

Demographics
- Demonym: De Île du Prince-de-Monaco
- Population: 0

Les Îles du Prince-de-Monaco (French pronunciation: [il dy pʁɛ̃s də mɔnako]) are a small group of 16 islands and islets belonging to France, located off Grande Terre, the principal island of the Kerguelen Islands.

They are located in Audierne Bay around 0.5 kilometres (1,600 feet) from Bourdonnais Point. The two main isles of the group are separated by a narrow strait and on the southern island, l'Île Sud du Prince-de-Monaco, an unnamed hill reaches an elevation of 99 metres (325 feet) above sea level.

Their name was chosen by Raymond Rallier du Baty in 1908/1909 to honour Albert I, Prince of Monaco.
