= Île Haute =

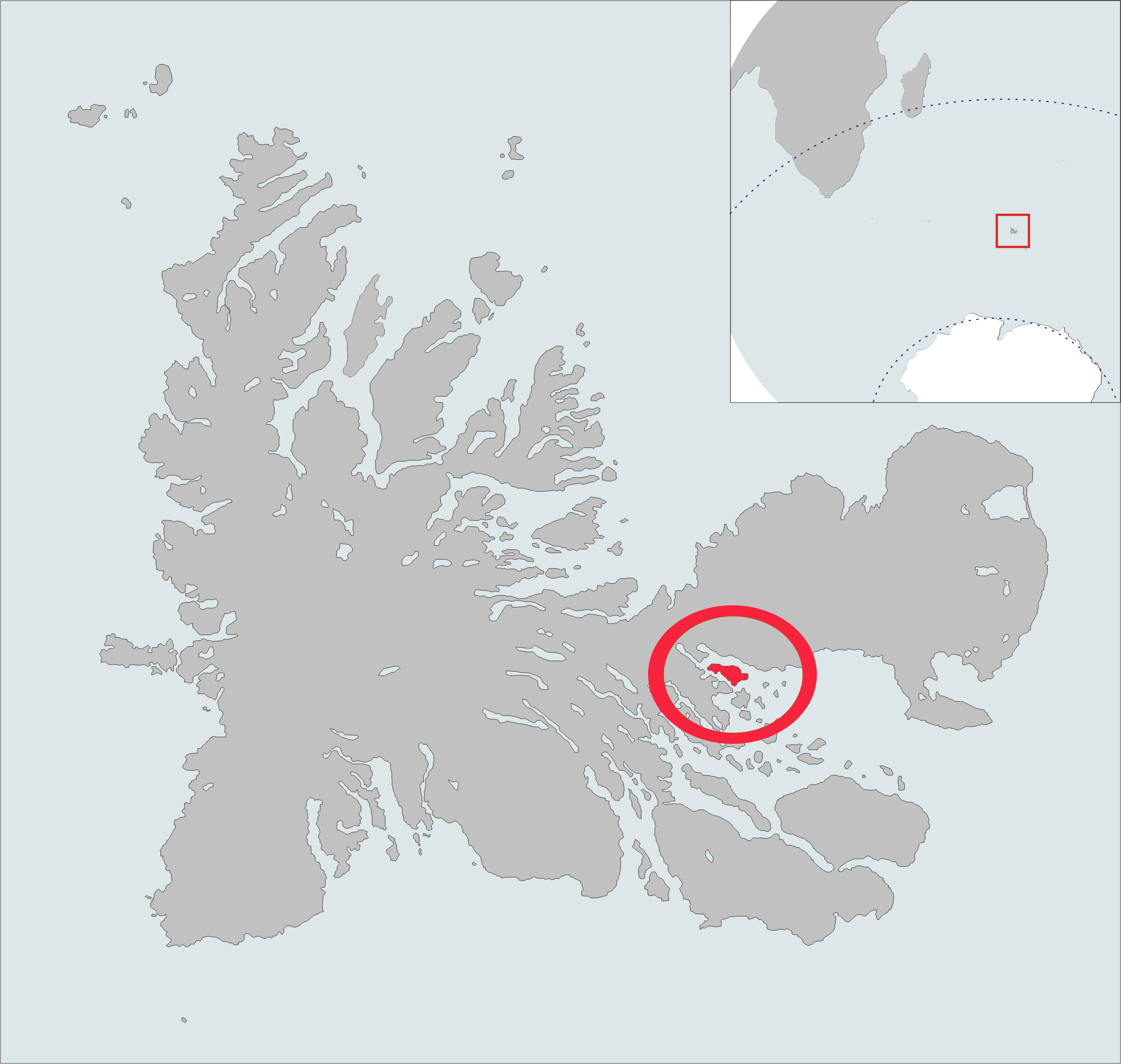
- The île Haute is highlighted on this Kerguelen Islands map.
- Interactive map of Île Haute

Geography
- Location: Indian Ocean
- Coordinates: 49°22′S 69°54′E
- Archipelago: Îles Kerguelen
- Length: 6 km (3.7 mi)
- Width: 2 km (1.2 mi)
- Highest elevation: 321 m (1053 ft).
- Highest point: Table des Mouflons

Administration
- France
- District: Îles Kerguelen

Demographics
- Population: 0

Île Haute (French pronunciation: [il ot]) is one of the Kerguelen Islands situated in the Golfe du Morbihan near the coast of Grande Terre, the principal island.

It is around 6 km long and 2 km wide. The highest point is the Table des Mouflons, at 321 metres.
