= Île Gaby =

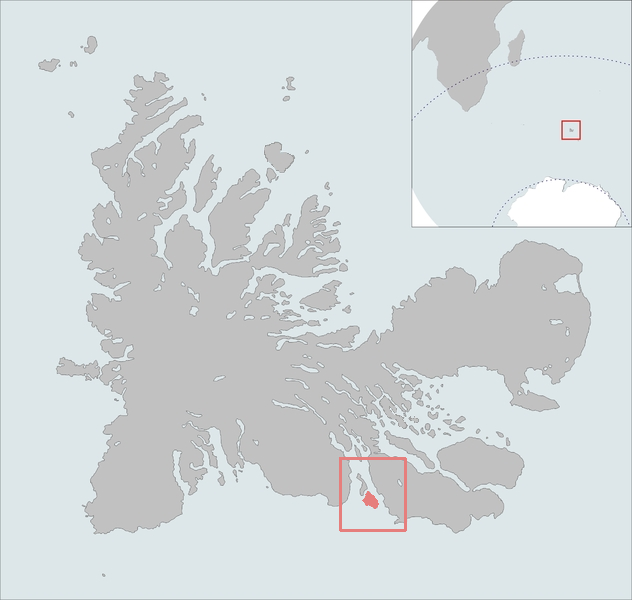
- The Île Gaby is highlighted on this Kerguelen Islands map.
- Interactive map of Île Gaby

Geography
- Location: Indian Ocean
- Coordinates: 49°39′S 69°46′E
- Archipelago: Îles Kerguelen
- Highest elevation: 677 m (2221 ft)
- Highest point: unnamed mountain

Administration
- France
- District: Îles Kerguelen

Demographics
- Population: 0

Île Gaby is one of the Kerguelen Islands near the coast of Grande Terre, the principal island.

It lies in the Swains Bay between the south-eastern part of the Gallieni Peninsula and the west coast of the Joan of Arc Peninsula, around 1 km SE of the Altazin Island.

The highest point of the island is an unnamed mountain that reaches the elevation of 677 m above the sea level.
