= Île de Croÿ =

Uninhabited island within the Kergulen's

Coordinates: 48.637134°S 68.63952°E

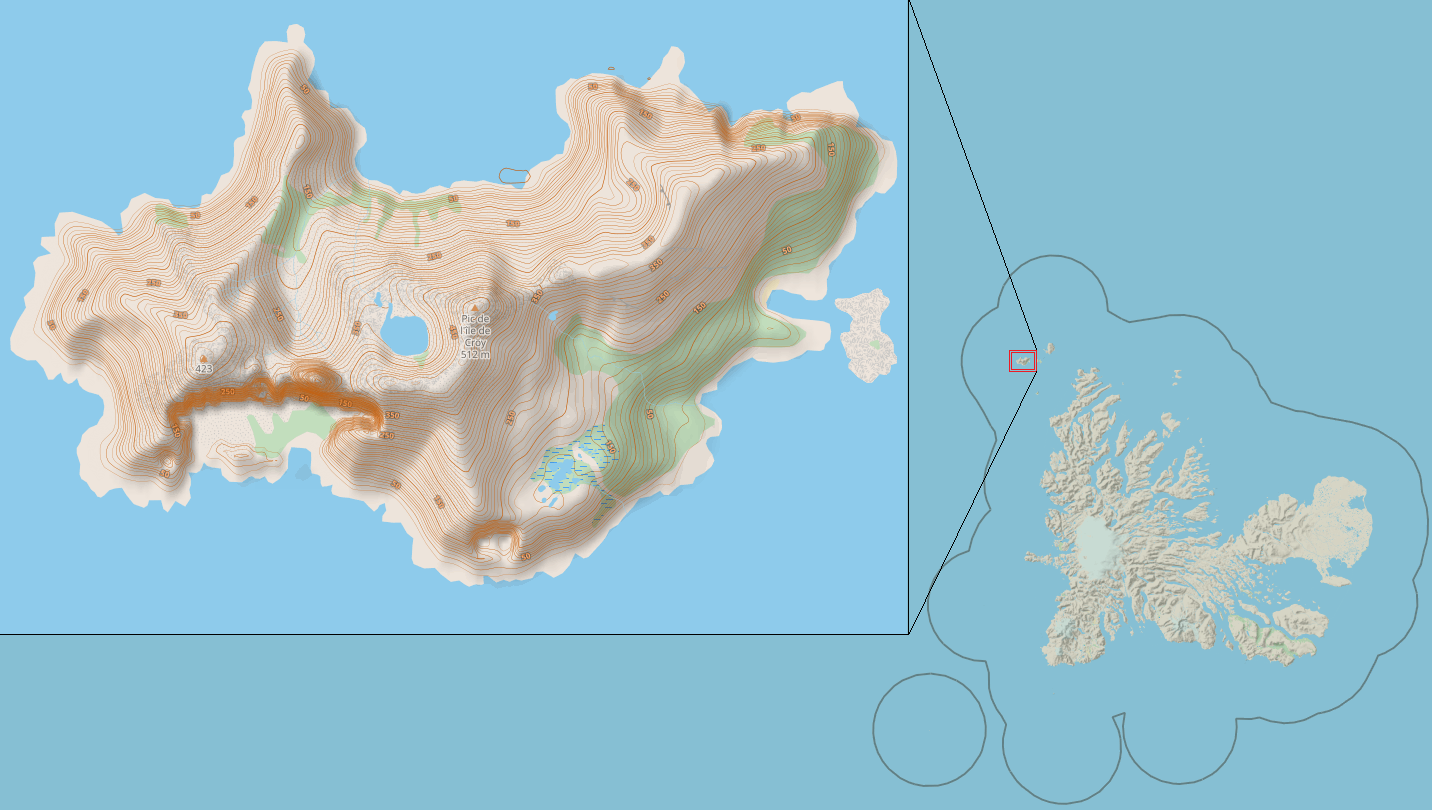
Île de Croÿ within Kerguelen archipelago

Île de Croÿ (Croy Island) is an unpopulated island that is part of an archipelago known as the Kerguelen Islands, situated approximately 16 kilometers (10 miles) north-west of the main island. It is located at 48°38'19.3"S 68°37'18.6"E, and is part of the French Southern and Antarctic Lands.

== History ==
Île de Croÿ was discovered in 1776 by Captain James Cook as part of his nautical expedition through the southern hemisphere. It is the largest of five islands in a small group Cook named the 'Cloudy Isles', now known as Iles Nuageuses.

== Geography and Geology ==
Île de Croÿ, at its highest peak, rises 518 meters (1,699 feet) above sea level. The island stretches 5.61 kilometers (3.49 miles) long between its furthermost points, and covers an area of approximately 16 square kilometers (6.2 square miles).The majority of the archipelago is the result of volcanic activity, as indicated by its high concentration of flood basalt and trachytic ignimbrite. The composition and burial depth of the ignimbrite indicates that the last major volcanic eruption in the area occurred between 23,000 and 29,000 years ago, near the end of the Pleistocene.

== Climate ==
The temperature in Île de Croÿ is usually cold, with a temperature averaging 9.0 degrees celsius (48.2 degrees Fahrenheit) in the summer months, and an extremely varying but generally below freezing in winter months. It is classified as a tundra environment due to its low temperature and significant precipitation.

== Flora and Fauna ==
Living on the island are penguins, albatrosses, and seals. No introduced species are present.

List of animal species present on the island
Common name	Scientific name	IUCN Red List status	IUCN Red List citation
Antarctic fur seal	Arctocephalus gazella	Least Concern	
Antarctic prion	Pachyptila desolata	Least Concern	
Black-browed albatross	Thalassarche melanophris	Least Concern	
Black-faced sheathbill	Chionis minor	Least Concern	
Common diving petrel	Pelecanoides urinatrix	Least Concern	
Eaton's pintail	Anas eatoni	Vunerable	
Gentoo penguin	Pygoscelis papua	Least Concern	
Grey-headed albatross	Thalassarche chrysostoma	Endangered	
Kerguelen petrel	Aphrodroma brevirostris	Least Concern	
Kerguelen tern	Sterna virgata	Near Threatened	
Light-mantled albatross	Phoebetria palpebrata	Near Threatened	
Northern giant petrel	Macronectes halli	Least Concern	
Snowy albatross	Diomedea exulans	Vunerable	
Southern rockhopper penguin	Eudyptes chrysocome	Vunerable	
White-chinned petrel	Procellaria aequinoctialis	Vunerable	
Wilson's storm petrel	Oceanites oceanicus	Least Concern	
