= Île Longue (Kerguelen Islands) =

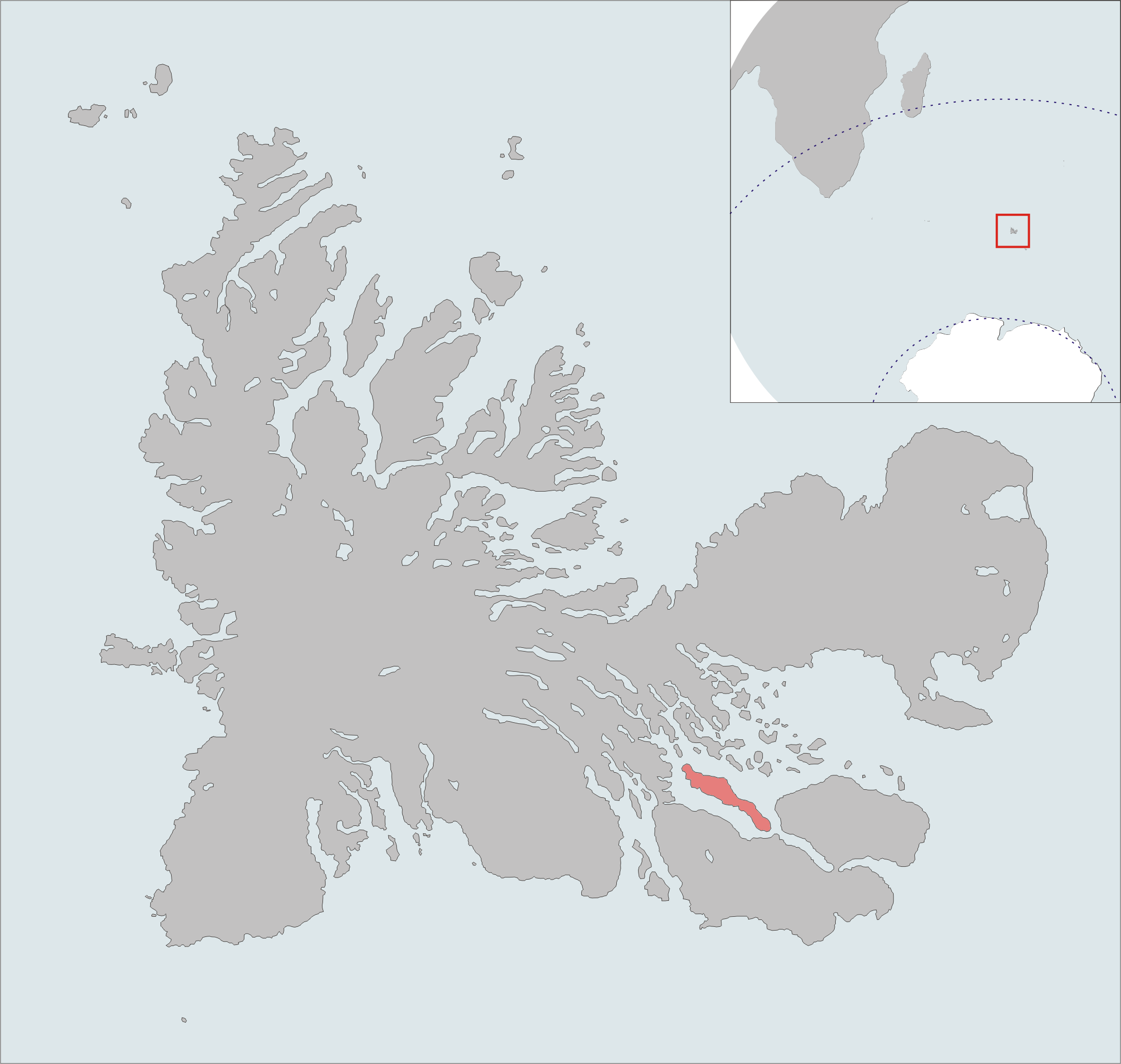
- The île Longue is highlighted on this Kerguelen Islands map.
- Interactive map of Île Longue

Geography
- Location: Indian Ocean
- Coordinates: 49°32′S 69°54′E
- Archipelago: Îles Kerguelen
- Area: 35.0 km^{2} (13.5 sq mi)
- Highest elevation: 270 m (890 ft)
- Highest point: Pic d'Antoine

Administration
- France
- District: Îles Kerguelen

Demographics
- Population: 0

Île Longue (French pronunciation: [il lɔ̃ɡ]) is one of the Kerguelen Islands situated near to the south-east coast of Grande Terre, the principal island.

The highest point is a mountain named Pic d'Antoine, at 270 metres.

From 1950 the island hosted about 3500 free range sheep bred in order to provide fresh meat to the Port-aux-Français settlement. This population was eradicated by 2016.
