= 15,000 Miles in a Ketch =

1917 book by Captain Raymond Rallier du Baty

- Author: Captain Raymond Rallier du Baty
- Language: English
- Genre: Non-fiction Narrative, Sailing, Exploration
- Published: 1917
- Publisher: Thomas Nelson and Sons
- Publication place: Great Britain
- Pages: 374

15,000 Miles in a Ketch is a non-fiction book written by French explorer and sailor Captain Raymond Rallier du Baty, published by Thomas Nelson and Sons in 1922. The book describes Captain du Baty's experience on the voyage of the J.B. Charcot, a small French fishing ketch which weighed 48 tons. The aim of this voyage was to chart the subantarctic Kerguelen Islands, which they funded by hunting southern elephant seals in the local area and selling their oil. The crew set out from Boulogne in September 1907. and sailed across the South Atlantic, Antarctic and Indian seas to outside Melbourne Harbour in July 1909. The voyage totalled a distance of 15,000 miles, which is where the name of the novel originates.

== Translations ==
Although du Baty's native language was French, 15,000 Miles in a Ketch was first published in English. It was later translated to and published in French in 1991 by Ed. maritimes et d'outre-mer under the title, Aventures aux Kerguelen.

== Preface ==
Since Francis Drake went round the world in the Golden Hind there has perhaps been no voyage quite so venturesome as that in a little French fishing ketch, of forty-five tons, called the J.B. Charcot, which set out from Boulogne in September of the year 1907, and, sailing across the South Atlantic, and the Antarctic and Indian seas, lay to outside Melbourne Harbour in July 1909 - a distance of 15,000 miles.

She was commanded by two young French-men hardly more than boys in age, though captains in the French merchant service, named Raymond and Henri du Baty, and she carried a tiny crew of one seaman and three lads.

When a little while ago Captain Raymond Rallier du Baty was welcomed home by the French Geographical Society, Prince Roland Bonaparte, its president, summed up the voyage in the following words:

'You are sixteenth-century adventurers,' he said, 'who have been lost in the twentieth.'

The story of their remarkable trip in the little J. B. Charcot, named after the famous French explorer who has just returned from the Antarctic, as written by the leader of the expedition, is a true and vivid tale of romance and adventure which carries one back to the youth of the world, when men first began to venture out into unknown seas in frail craft. With high spirits, full of French gaiety, he tells of terrific storms encountered by his fishing boat, and of the many hardships which they faced with brave hearts.
