= List of rivers of the Kerguelen Islands =

This is a list of rivers in the Kerguelen Islands, a group of subantarctic islands belonging to France in the southern Indian Ocean.

| Name | Source location | Coordinates | Length |
|---|---|---|---|
| Riveiére de Albatros | Courbet Peninsula | 49°15′27″S 70°15′3″E | 16.3 km |
| Riviére Larmor | Rallier du Baty peninsula | 49°28′39″S 69°53′30″E | 20 km |
| Riviére Arago | Rallier du Baty peninsula | 49°28′49″S 69°43′12″E | 1 km |
| Riviére de l'Amphi | Rallier du Baty peninsula | 49°31′45″S 68°57′35″E | 8.3 km |
| Gave de l'Azorella | Central Plateau | 49°31′45″S 68°57′35″E | 20 km |
| Riviére des Americaines | Courbet Peninsula | 49°20′32″S 70°0′11″E | 6 km |
| Gave de l'Acoena | Jeanne d'Arc Peninsula | 49°39′49″S 69°53′43″E | 10 km |
| Riviére Ampére | Central Plateau | 49°25′5″S 69°11′25″E | 10 km |
| L'arve | Central Plateau | 49°13′9″S 69°9′35″E | 9.6 km |
| L'Alster | Central Plateau | 49°22′8″S 69°18′5″E | 25 km |
| Riviére de Bungay | Courbet Peninsula | 49°16′33″S 70°22′54″E | 14 km |
