= Île de l'Ouest =

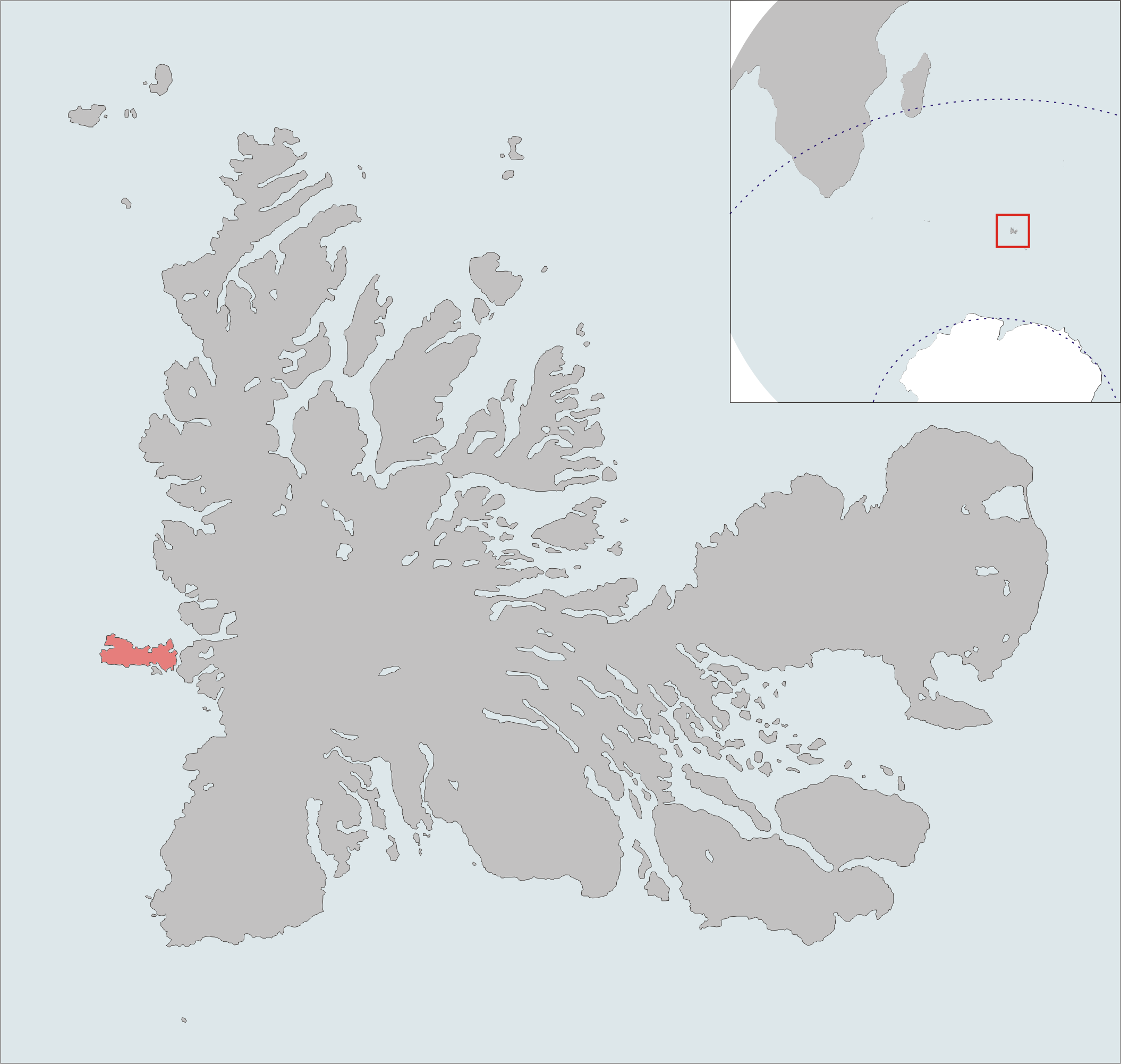
- The île de l'Ouest is highlighted on this Kerguelen Islands map.
- Interactive map of Île de l'Ouest

Geography
- Location: Indian Ocean
- Coordinates: 49°21′S 68°44′E
- Archipelago: Îles Kerguelen
- Total islands: 1
- Major islands: Île de l'Ouest
- Area: 33.0 km^{2} (12.7 sq mi)
- Area rank: 6th(In the Kerguelen Islands)
- Length: 5 km (3.1 mi)
- Width: 12 km (7.5 mi)
- Coastline: 30 km (19 mi)
- Highest elevation: 617 m (2024 ft)
- Highest point: Pic Philippe d'Orléans

Administration
- France
- District: Îles Kerguelen

Demographics
- Demonym: Oueste
- Population: 0

The Île de l'Ouest (French pronunciation: [il də lwɛst]) is a French island in the Kerguelen archipelago located west of Grande Terre in the extension of the Lakes peninsula, by the foothills of the Cook glacier. It has two bays:Noroît Bay to the north and Bretonne Bay to the south.

It is divided by the Grande Terre by the détroit de la Marianne (Marianne's strait). The highest point is a mountain named Pic Philippe d'Orléans, at 617 metres.
