= Île Altazin =

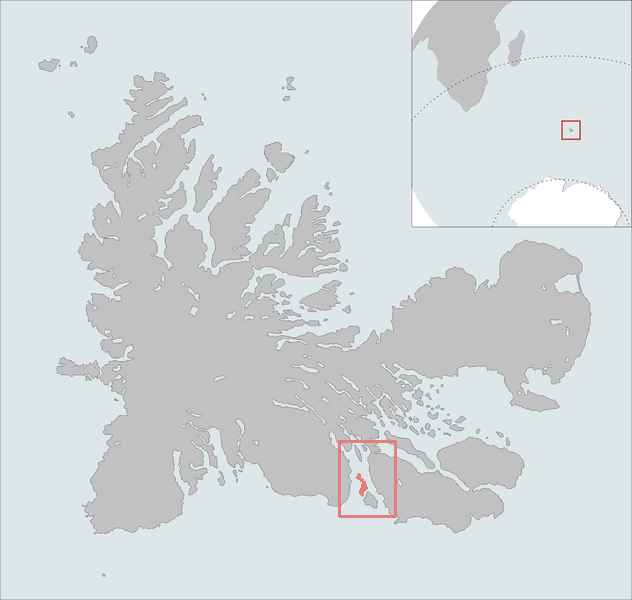
- The Île Altazin is highlighted on this Kerguelen Islands map.
- Interactive map of Île Altazin

Geography
- Location: Indian Ocean
- Coordinates: 49°38′S 69°45′E
- Archipelago: Îles Kerguelen
- Highest elevation: 292 m (958 ft)
- Highest point: unnamed hill

Administration
- France
- District: Îles Kerguelen

Demographics
- Population: 0

Île Altazin is one of the Kerguelen Islands near the coast of Grande Terre, the principal island.

It lies in the Swains Bay between the south-eastern part of the Gallieni Peninsula and the west coast of the Joan of Arc Peninsula, around 1 km NW of the Gaby Island.

The highest point of the island is an unnamed hill that reaches the elevation of 292 m above the sea level.
