= Kerguelen Islands =

French-administered sub-Antarctic archipelago

Kerguelen Islands Îles Kerguelen (French)
- Flag of the French Southern and Antarctic Lands Coat of arms
- Motto: "Liberté, égalité, fraternité" (French) (English: "Liberty, equality, fraternity")
- Anthem: La Marseillaise ("The Marseillaise")
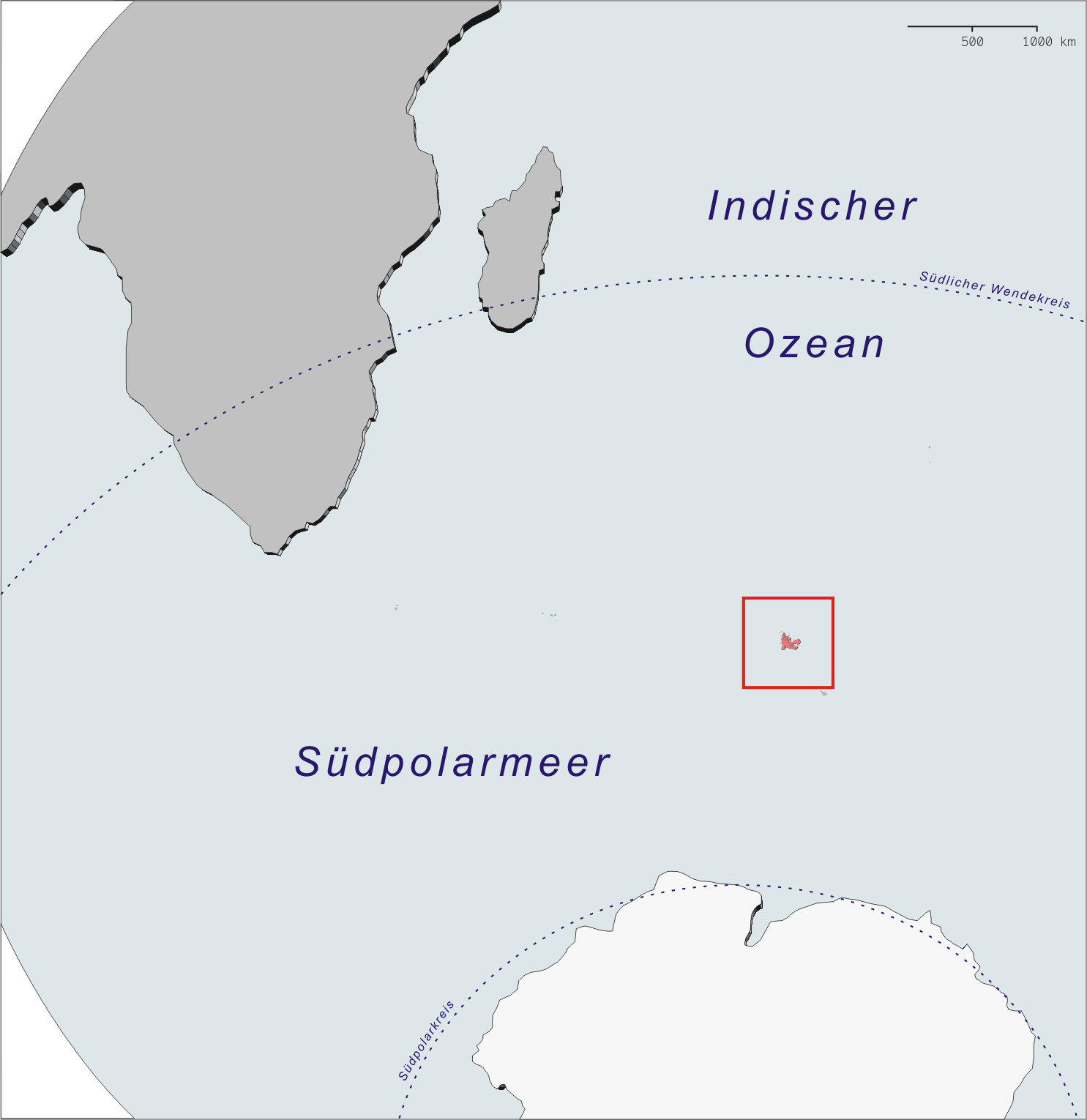
- Location of the Kerguelen Islands in the southern Indian Ocean

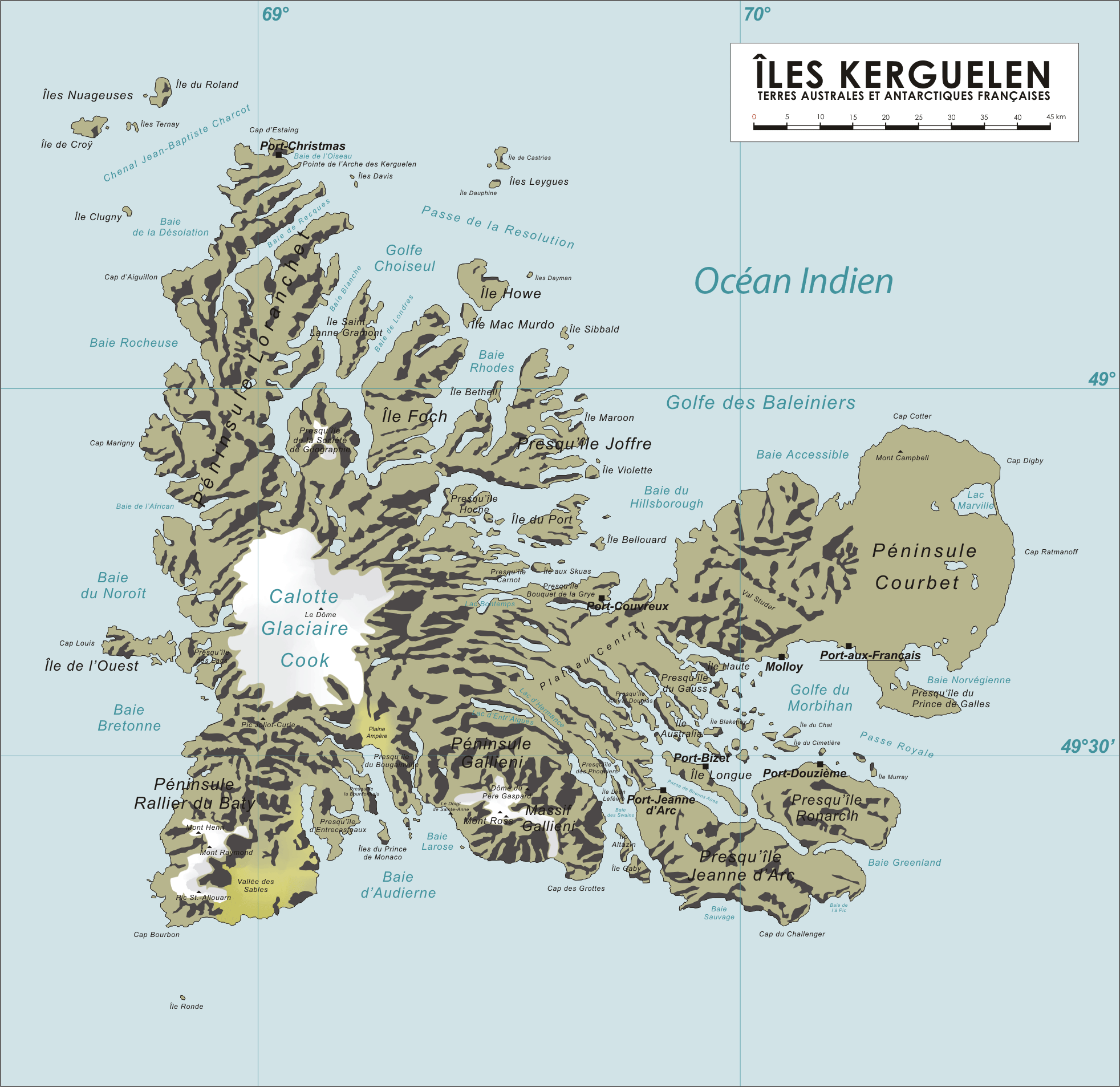
- Map of the Kerguelen Islands
- Status: District of the French Southern and Antarctic Lands
- Largest settlement: Port-aux-Français
- Official languages: French
- Demonym: Kerguelenois

Government
  - President: Emmanuel Macron
  - Administrator: Pascal Bolot
  - Head of District: Disker

French overseas territory
  - Initial discovery and claim: 13 February 1772
  - Re-annexation: 1 January 1893
  - Administered as a district of the French Southern and Antarctic Lands: 1955

Area
  - Total: 7,215 km^{2} (2,786 sq mi)
  - Water (%): c. 20%

Population
  - Estimate: ~110 (summer); ~45 (winter)
- Currency: Euro (EUR)
- Time zone: UTC+5
- Calling code: +262
- Internet TLD: .tf

Kerguelen Islands
UNESCO World Heritage Site
- Interactive map of Kerguelen Islands
- Part of: French Austral Lands and Seas
- Criteria: Natural: vii, ix, x
- Reference: 1603bis-002
- Inscription: 2019 (43rd Session)

The Kerguelen Islands, (Note: Pronounced /kərˈɡeɪlən/ kər-GAY-lən or /ˈkɜːrɡələn/ KUR-gə-lən; French: Îles Kerguelen, pronounced [il kɛʁɡelɛn], officially Archipel Kerguelen, pronounced [aʁʃipɛl kɛʁɡelɛn].) also known as the Desolation Islands, (Note: French: Îles de la Désolation, pronounced [il də la dezɔlasjɔ̃].) are a group of islands in the subantarctic region. They are among the most isolated places on Earth, with the closest territory being the Heard Island and McDonald Islands territory of Australia roughly 450 kilometres (240 nautical miles) to the southeast, and the nearest permanently inhabited territory being Madagascar more than 3,300 km (1,800 nmi) away. The islands, along with Adélie Land, the Crozet Islands, Amsterdam and Saint Paul islands, and France's Scattered Islands in the Indian Ocean, are part of the French Southern and Antarctic Lands and are administered as a separate district.

The islands constitute one of the two exposed parts of the Kerguelen Plateau (the other being Heard Island and the McDonald islands), a large igneous province mostly submerged in the southern Indian Ocean. The main island, Grande Terre, is 6,675 km^{2} (2,577 mi^{2}) in area, about three-quarters of the size of Corsica, and is surrounded by a further 300 smaller islands and islets, forming an archipelago of 7,215 km^{2} (2,786 mi^{2}). The climate is harsh and chilly with frequent high winds throughout the year. The surrounding seas are generally rough and they remain ice-free year-round. There are no indigenous inhabitants, but France maintains a permanent presence of 45 to 100 soldiers, scientists, engineers, and researchers. There are no airports on the islands, so all travel to and from the outside world is by ship.

== History ==
=== Discovery ===
Before being officially catalogued in 1772, the Kerguelen Islands appear as the "Ile de Nachtegal" on Philippe Buache's 1754 map of the islands of the Southern Ocean. It is possible this early name was after Abel Tasman's ship De Zeeuwsche Nachtegaal. On the Buache map, "Ile de Nachtegal" is located at 43°S, 72°E, about 6° north and 2° east of the actual location of Grande Terre.

The islands were officially discovered by the French navigator Yves-Joseph de Kerguelen-Trémarec on 12 February 1772. The next day, Charles du Boisguehenneuc landed and claimed the island for the French crown. Yves de Kerguelen organised a second expedition in 1773 and arrived at the "baie de l'Oiseau" by December 1773. On 6 January 1774 he commanded his lieutenant, Henri Pascal de Rochegude, to leave a message notifying any passers-by of the two passages and of the French claim to the islands.

Thereafter, a number of expeditions briefly visited the islands, including the third voyage of Captain James Cook in December 1776. Cook verified and confirmed the passage of de Kerguelen by discovering and annotating the message left by the French navigator, calling it Kerguelen Land in his honour. Cook nonetheless claimed the islands for the British Empire.

=== Sealing era and further exploration ===
Soon after its discovery, the archipelago was regularly visited by whalers and sealers (mostly British, American, and Norwegian) who hunted the resident populations of whales and seals to the point of near extinction, including fur seals in the 18th century and elephant seals in the 19th century. The sealing era lasted from 1781 to 1922 during which time 284 sealing visits are recorded, nine of which ended when the vessel was wrecked. Modern industrial sealing, associated with whaling stations, occurred intermittently between 1908 and 1956. Since the end of the whaling and sealing era, most of the islands' species have been able to increase their population again. Relics of the sealing period include try pots, hut ruins, graves and inscriptions.

In 1800, the Hillsborough spent eight months sealing and whaling around the islands. During this time Captain Robert Rhodes, her master, prepared a chart of the islands. That vessel returned to London in April 1801 with 450 tons of sea elephant oil.

In 1825, the British sealer John Nunn and three crew members from Favourite were shipwrecked on Kerguelen until they were rescued in 1827 by Captain Alexander Distant during his hunting campaign.

The islands were not completely surveyed until the Ross expedition of 1840.

The Australian James Kerguelen Robinson (1859–1914) was the first human born south of the Antarctic Convergence, on board the sealing ship Offley in Gulf of Morbihan (Royal Sound then), Kerguelen Island on 11 March 1859.

In 1874–1875, British, German, and U.S. expeditions visited Kerguelen to observe the transit of Venus. For the 1874 transit, George Biddell Airy of the U.K. Royal Observatory organised and equipped five expeditions to different parts of the world. Three of these were sent to the Kerguelen Islands and led by Stephen Joseph Perry, who set up his main observation station at Observatory Bay and two auxiliary stations, one at Thumb Peak led by Sommerville Goodridge, and the second at Supply Bay, led by Cyril Corbet. Observatory Bay was also used by the German Antarctic Expedition, led by Erich Dagobert von Drygalski in 1902–1903. In January 2007, an archaeological excavation was carried out at this site.

In 1877 the French started a coal mining operation, but soon abandoned it.

=== Reoccupation ===
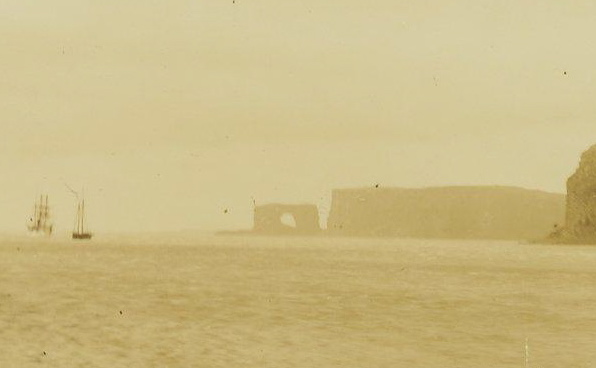
Port-Christmas and the Kerguelen Arch on 2 January 1893, a day after France reasserted its claim to Kerguelen

In the early 1890s, French brothers René-Émile and Henri Bossière lobbied the French government to re-assert its original claim to Kerguelen, believing it would make it a suitable area for sheep farming similar to their previous operations in Patagonia. France sent the aviso Eure, under Commander Louis Édouard Paul Lieutard, to the area and on 1 January 1893 formally claimed the island for a second time, which received international recognition and was not contested by the British Empire. The French government granted the Bossière brothers a 50-year lease over the island for the purposes of establishing a sheep-farming colony, although no settlement was attempted until 1908.

In 1901, following the federation of the British colonies in Australia, the new Australian federal government unsuccessfully lobbied the British government to acquire the Kerguelen Islands from France for strategic purposes. The Australian government viewed the islands' natural harbours as suitable for naval operations and believed that the islands could support a colony based around farming, fishing and mining. The British government ultimately rejected the proposal in August 1901, as it did not believe negotiations with France would be successful and did not consider that the islands posed a strategic threat.

In 1908, the French explorer Raymond Rallier du Baty made a privately funded expedition to the island. His autobiographical account of the adventure (15,000 Miles in a Ketch. Thomas Nelson and Sons: London, 1917) describes the months that he spent surveying the island and hunting seals to finance his expedition.

In 1924, it was decided to administer the Kerguelen Islands, the islands of Amsterdam and St. Paul, and the Crozet Archipelago (in addition to that portion of Antarctica claimed by France and known as Adélie Land) from Madagascar; as with all Antarctic territorial claims, France's possession on the continent is held in abeyance until a new international treaty is ratified that defines each claimant's rights and obligations.

The German auxiliary cruiser Atlantis called at Kerguelen during November 1940. During their stay the crew performed maintenance and replenished their water supplies. This ship's first fatality of the war occurred when a sailor, Bernhard Herrmann, fell while painting the funnel. He is buried in Port Couvreux.

Kerguelen has been continually occupied since 1950 by scientific research teams, with a population of 50 to 100 personnel frequently present. There is also a French satellite tracking station.

Until 1955, the Kerguelen Islands were administratively part of the French Colony of Madagascar and Dependencies. That same year, they collectively became known as Les Terres australes et antarctiques françaises (French Southern and Antarctic Lands) and were administratively part of the French Département d'outre-mer de la Réunion. In 2004 they were permanently transformed into their own entity (keeping the same name) but having inherited another group of five very remote tropical islands, les îles Éparses, which are also ruled by France and are dispersed around the island of Madagascar.

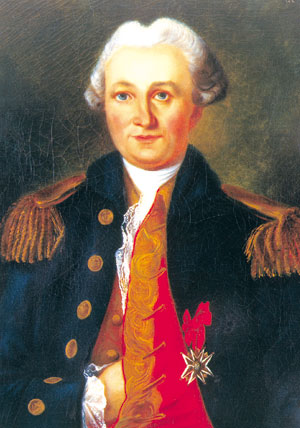
The islands are named after French explorer Yves-Joseph de Kerguelen-Trémarec.

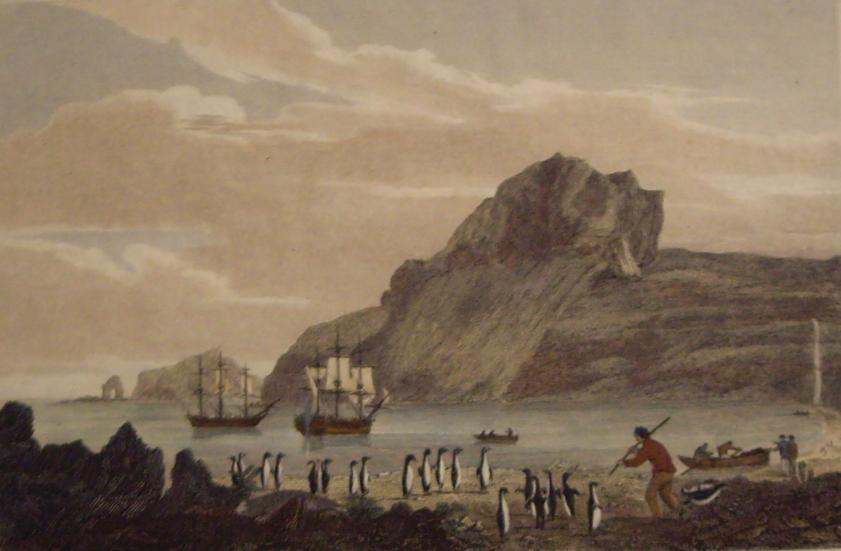
Christmas Harbour, Kerguelens Land, 1811, by the English engraver George Cooke. The location is now known as Port-Christmas.

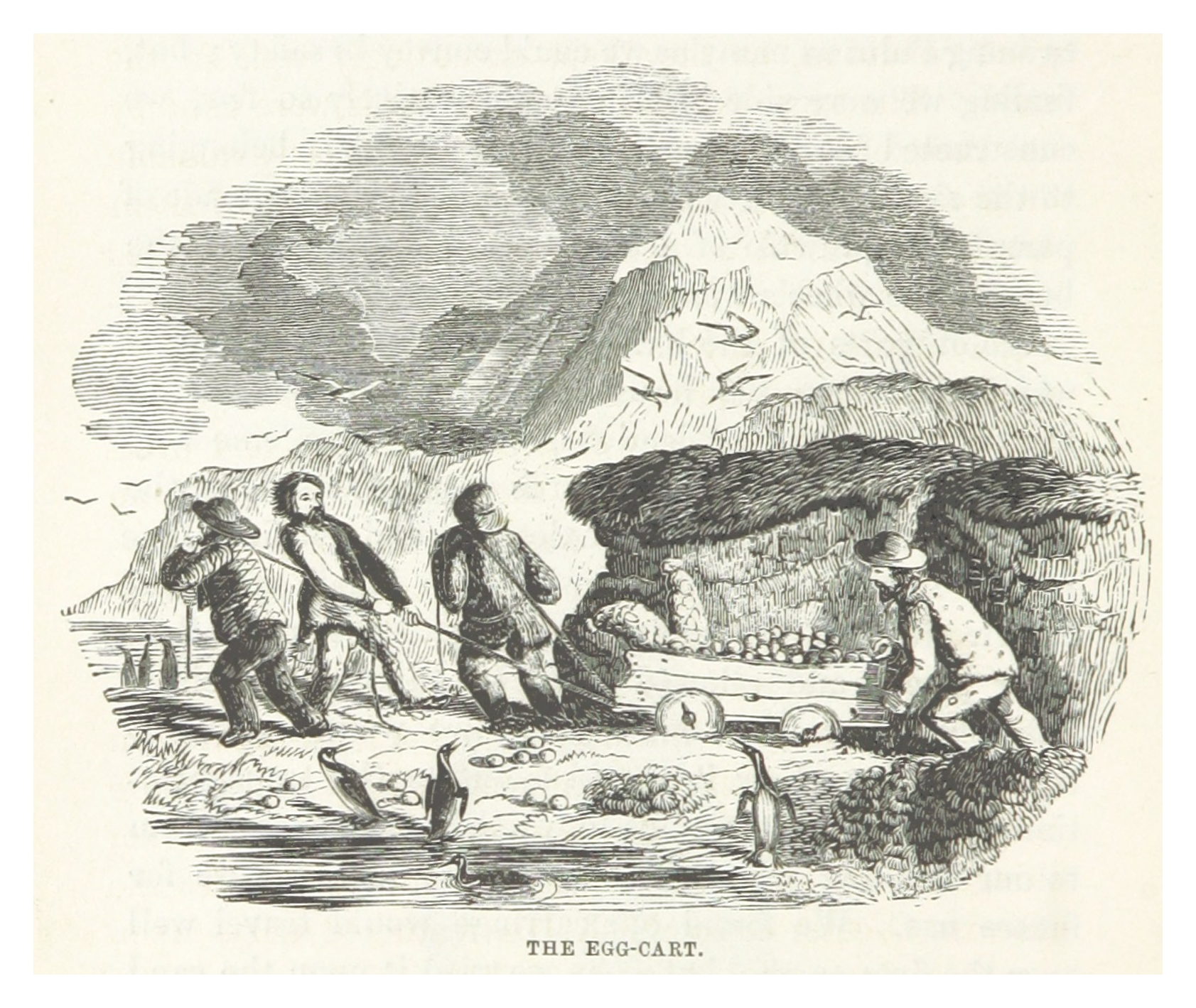
Illustration from John Nunn's book about the three years he and his shipwrecked crew survived on the island in the 1820s

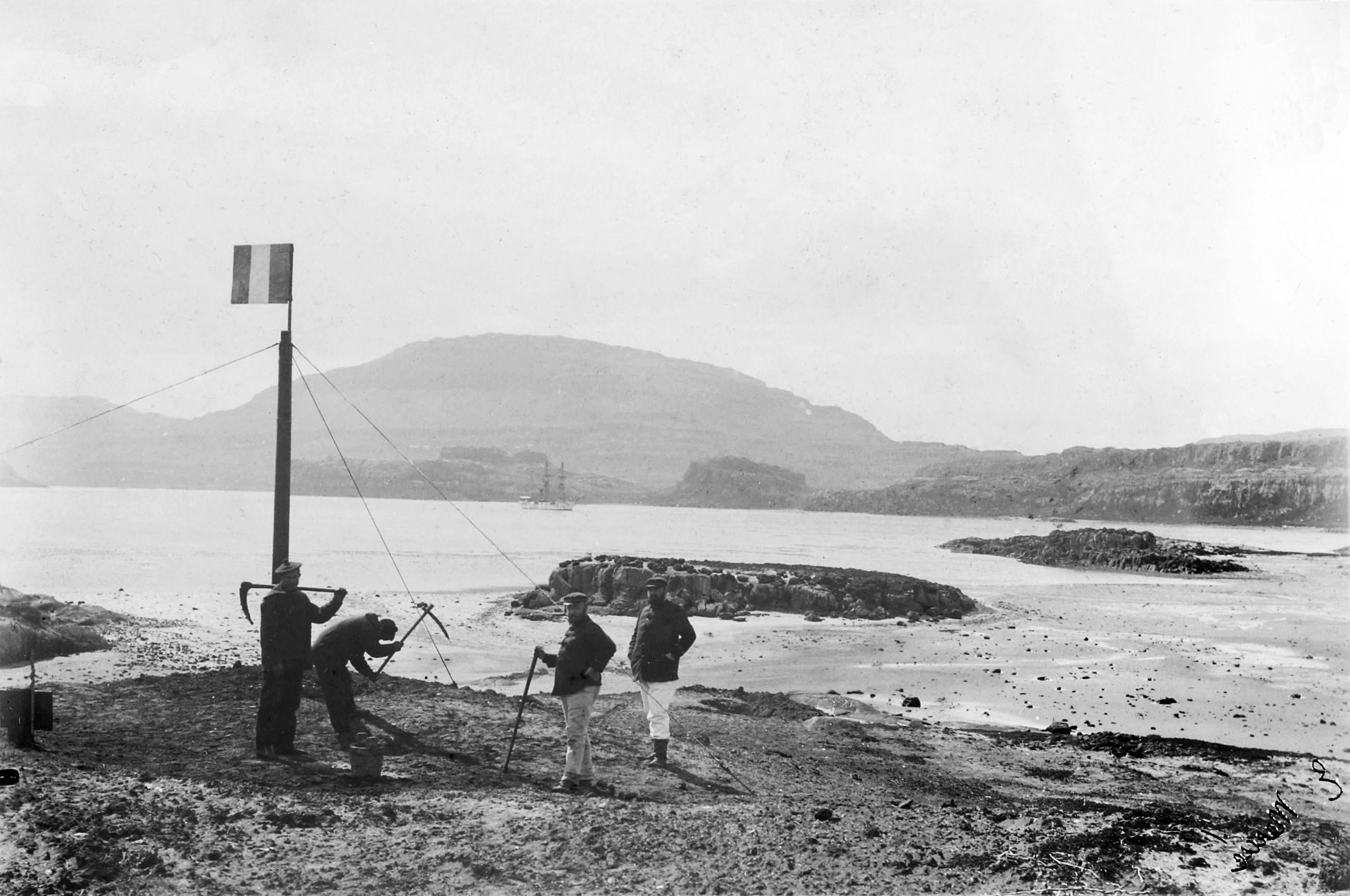
French sailors officially reasserting possession of the Islands on 8 January 1893

== Grande Terre ==
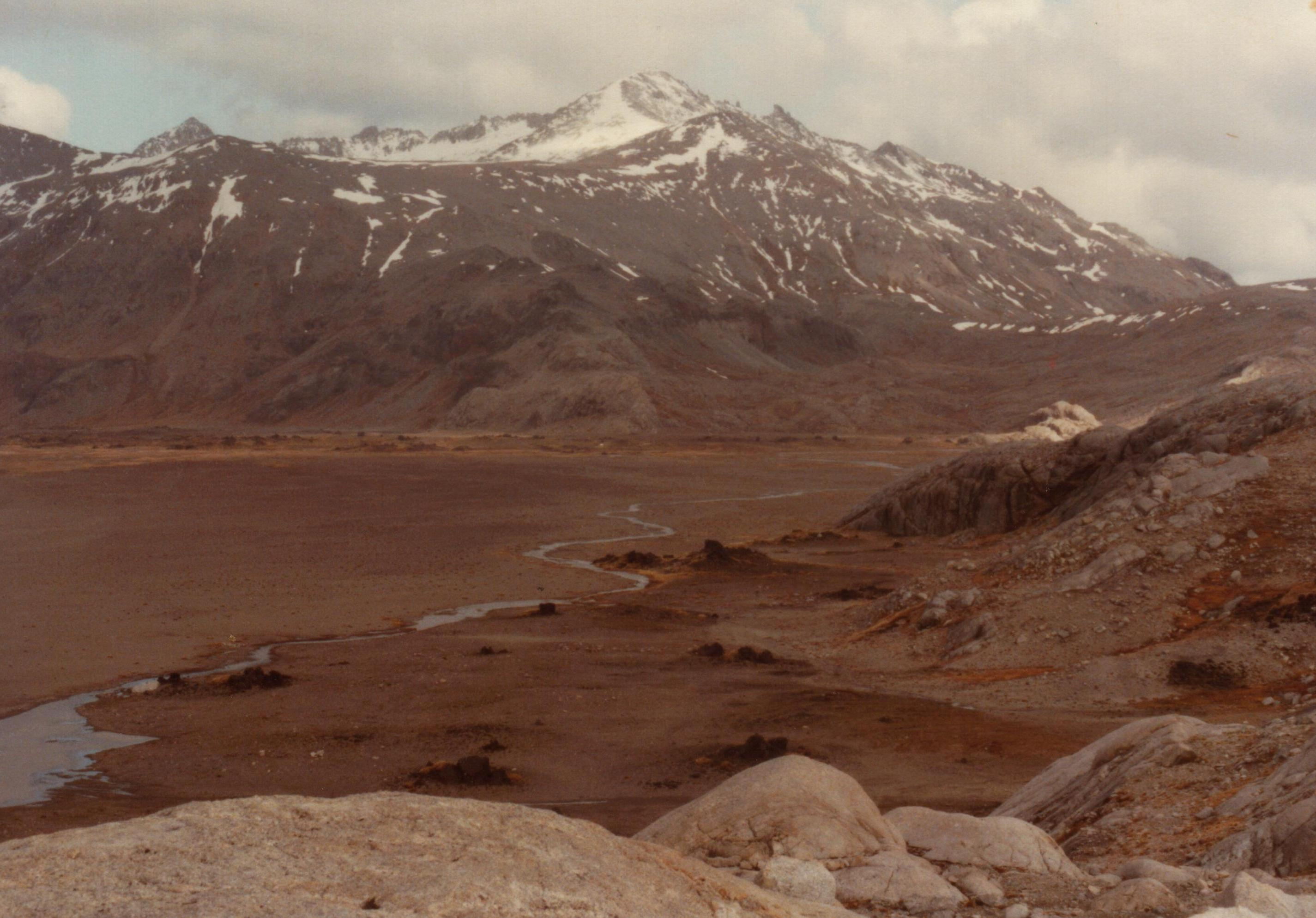
Péninsule Rallier du Baty with Le Bicorne rising in the background

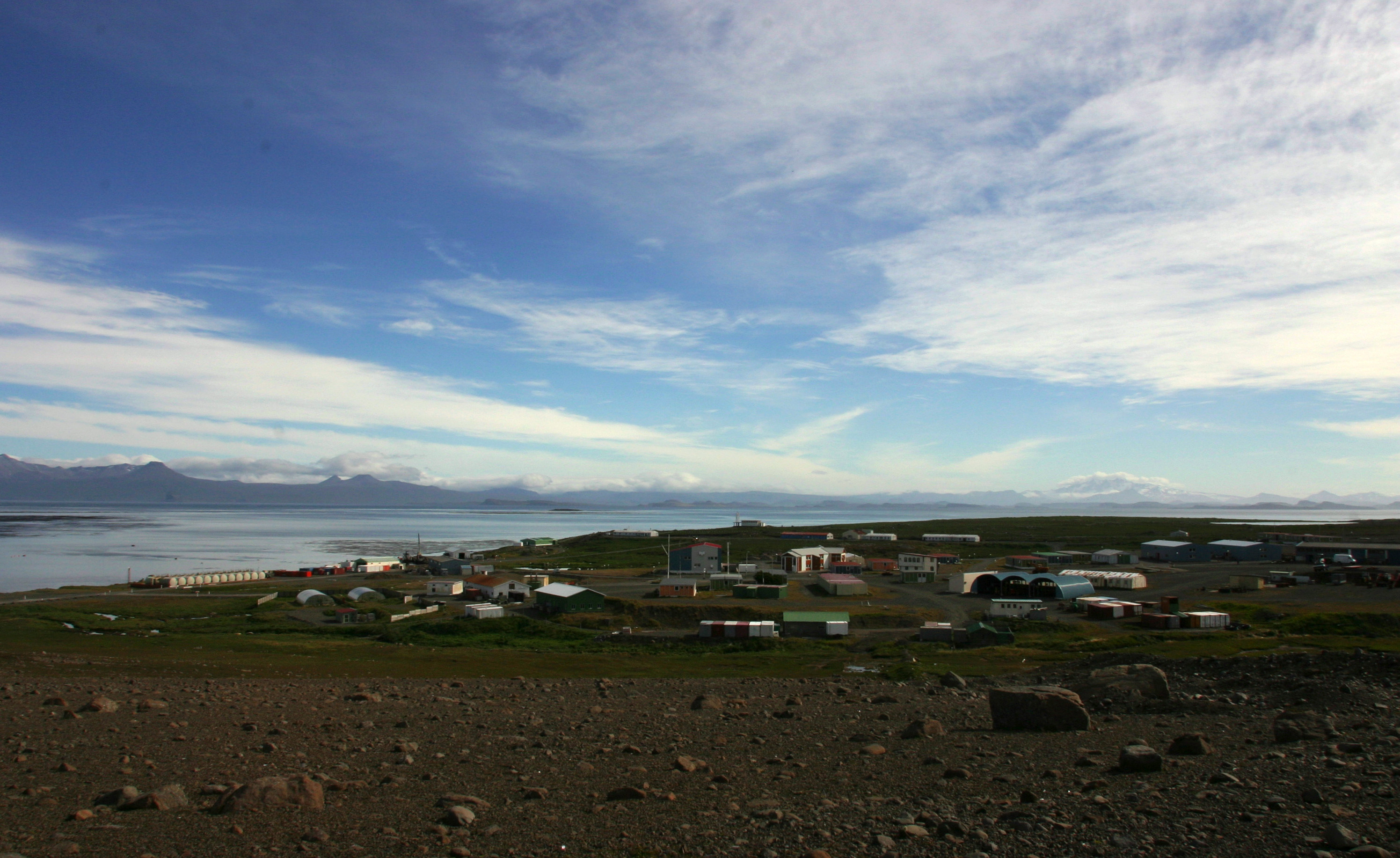
Port aux Français

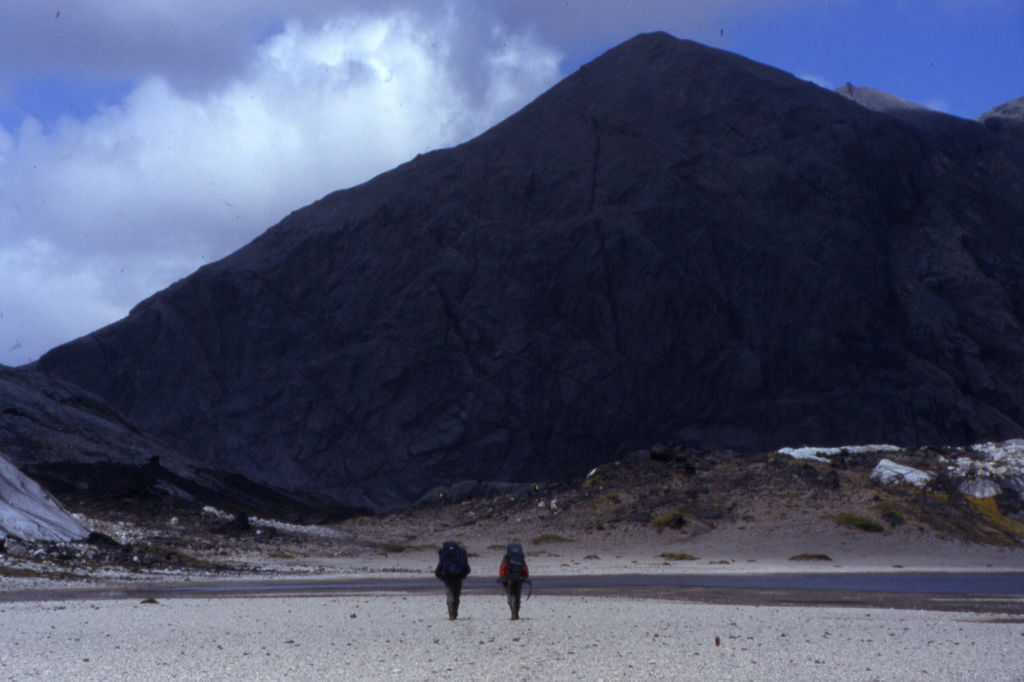
Two Brothers Mountains (Monts des Deux Frères)

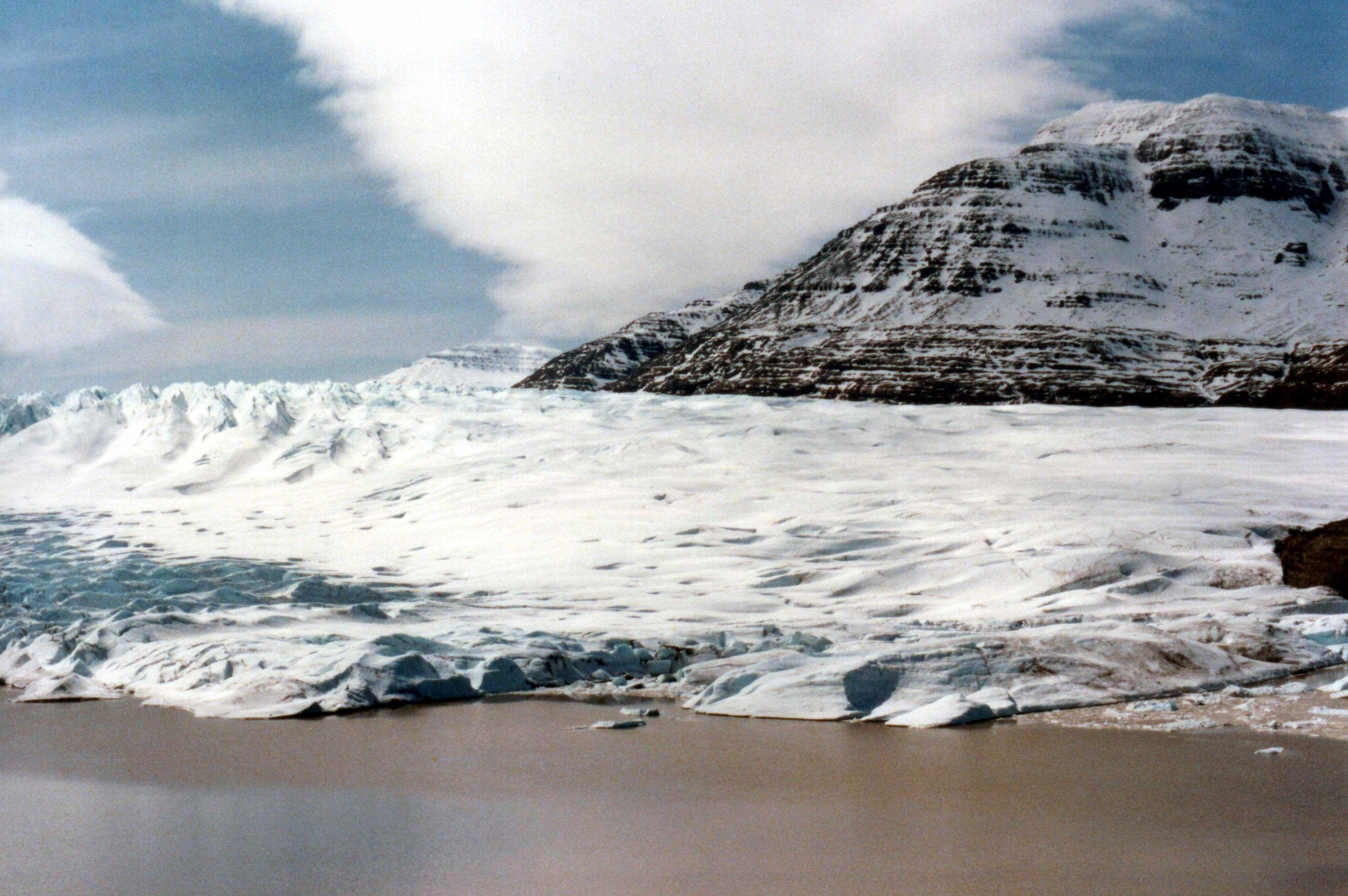
Terminus of a glacier of the Cook Ice Cap

The main island of the archipelago is called La Grande Terre. It measures 150 km (93 mi) east to west and 120 km (75 mi) north to south.

Port-aux-Français, a scientific base, is along the eastern shore of the Gulf of Morbihan on La Grande Terre. Facilities there include scientific-research buildings, a satellite tracking station, dormitories, a hospital, a library, a gymnasium, a pub, and the chapel of Notre-Dame des Vents.

The highest point is Mont Ross in the Gallieni Massif, which rises along the southern coast of the island and has an elevation of 1,850 metres (6,070 ft). The Cook Ice Cap (French: Calotte Glaciaire Cook), France's largest glacier with an area of about 403 km^{2} (156 sq mi), lies on the west-central part of the island. Overall, the glaciers of the Kerguelen Islands cover just over 500 km^{2} (190 sq mi). Grande Terre has also numerous bays, inlets, fjords, and coves, as well as several peninsulas and promontories. The most important ones are listed below:

- Courbet Peninsula
- Rallier du Baty Peninsula
- Péninsule Gallieni
- Péninsule Loranchet
- Péninsule Jeanne d'Arc
- Presqu'île Ronarc'h
- Presqu'île de la Société de Géographie
- Presqu'île Joffre
- Presqu'île du Prince de Galles
- Presqu'île du Gauss
- Presqu'île Bouquet de la Grye
- Presqu'île d'Entrecasteaux
- Presqu'île du Bougainville
- Presqu'île Hoche

=== Notable localities ===
There are also a number of notable localities, all on La Grande Terre (see the main map):

- Anse Betsy (Betsy Cove) is a former geomagnetic station on Baie Accessible (Accessible Bay), on the north coast of the Courbet Peninsula. An astronomical and geomagnetic observatory was erected here on 26 October 1874 by a German research expedition led by Georg Gustav Freiherr von Schleinitz. The primary goal of this station was to observe the 1874 transit of Venus.
- Armor (Base Armor), established in 1983, is located 40 km (25 mi) west of Port-aux-Français at the bottom of Morbihan Gulf, for the acclimatization of salmon to the Kerguelen islands.
- Baie de l'Observatoire (Observatory Bay) is a former geomagnetic observation station, just west of Port-Aux-Français, on the eastern fringe of the Central Plateau, along the northern shore of the Golfe du Morbihan.
- Cabane Port-Raymond is a scientific camp at the head of a fjord cutting into the Courbet Peninsula from the south.
- Cap Ratmanoff is the easternmost point of the Kerguelens.
- La Montjoie is a scientific camp on the south shore of Baie Rocheuse, along the northwestern coast of the archipelago.
- Molloy (Pointe Molloy) is a former observatory ten kilometres (6 mi) west of the present-day Port-Aux-Français, on the northern shore of the Golfe du Morbihan (Kerguelen). An American expedition led by G. P. Ryan erected a station at this site on September 7th, 1874. This station was also established to observe the 1874 transit of Venus.
- Port Bizet is a seismographic station on the northeastern coast of Île Longue. This also served as the principal sheep farm for the island's resident flock of Bizet sheep until 2016.
- Port Christmas is a former geomagnetic station on Baie de l'Oiseau, at the extreme northwest of the Loranchet Peninsula. It was named by Captain James Cook, who re-discovered the islands and who anchored there on Christmas Day, 1776. This is also the place where Captain Cook coined the name "Desolation Islands" in reference to what he saw as a sterile landscape.
- Port Couvreux, a former attempted permanent settlement based on experimental sheep farming on Baie du Hillsborough, at the southern end of Baleiniers Gulf. Starting in 1912, sheep were raised here to create an economic base for future settlement. However, the attempt failed and the last inhabitants had to be evacuated and the station abandoned in 1931. The huts remain, as well as a graveyard with five anonymous graves of settlers who were unable to survive in the harsh environment.
- Port Curieuse, a harbor on the west coast across Île de l'Ouest, was named after the ship La Curieuse, which was used by Raymond Rallier du Baty on his second visit to the islands (1913–14).
- Port Douzième (Twelfth Port) is a hut and former geomagnetic station on the southern shore of the Golfe du Morbihan.
- Port Jeanne d'Arc is a former whaling station founded by a Norwegian whaling company in 1908, and a former geomagnetic station, and lies in the northwestern corner of Presqu'île Jeanne d'Arc, looking across the Buenos Aires passage to Île Longue (4 km or 2 1/2 mi northeast). The derelict settlement consists of four residential buildings with wooden walls and tin roofs, and a barn. One of the buildings was restored in 1977, and another in 2007.

From 1968 to 1981, a site just east of Port-aux-Français was a launching site for sounding rockets, some for French (Dragon rockets), American (Arcas) or French-Soviet (Eridans) surveys, but at the end mainly for a Soviet program (M-100).

== Islands ==
The following is a list of the most important adjacent islands:

- Île Foch in the north of the archipelago, at 206 km^{2} (79 1/2 sq mi), the second most important outlier in the Kerguelens.
- Île Saint-Lanne Gramont, is to the west of Île Foch in the Golfe Choiseul. It has an area of 45.8 km^{2} (17 11/16 sq mi). Its highest point reaches 480 m (1,570 ft).
- Île du Port, also in the north in the Golfe des Baleiniers is the fourth largest satellite island with an area of 43 km^{2} (17 sq mi). Near its centre it reaches an elevation of 340 metres (1,120 ft).
- Île de l'Ouest (west coast, about 33 km^{2} (12 1/2 sq mi))
- Île Longue (southeast, about 35 km^{2} (13 1/2 sq mi))
- Îles Nuageuses (northwest, including île de Croÿ, île du Roland, îles Ternay, îles d'Après)
- Île de Castries
- Îles Leygues (north, including île de Castries, île Dauphine)
- Île Violette
- Île Australia (also known as Île aux Rennes – Reindeer Island) (western part of the Golfe du Morbihan, area 36.7 km^{2} (14 3/16 sq mi), elevation 145 m (476 ft))
- Île Haute (western part of the Golfe du Morbihan, elevation 321 m (1,053 ft))
- Île Mayès
- Îles du Prince-de-Monaco (south, in the Audierne bay)
- Îles de Boynes (four small islands 30 km or 16 nmi south of Presqu'ile Rallier du Baty on the main island)
- Île Altazin (a small island in the Swains Bay)
- Île Gaby (a small island in the Swains Bay)
- Île de Croÿ (a small island 20 km or 11 nmi off the coast of Grande Terre)
- Île du Roland (a small island 20 km or 11 nmi off the coast of Grande Terre)

== Economy ==
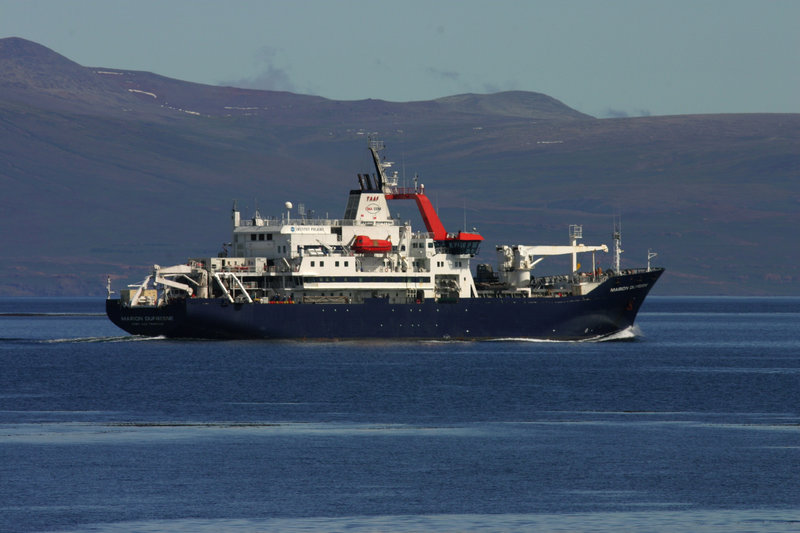
The French supply ship Marion Dufresne makes regular calls at the Kerguelen Islands.

Principal activities on the Kerguelen Islands focus on scientific research, mostly earth sciences and biology.

The former sounding rocket range to the east of Port-aux-Français is currently the site of a SuperDARN radar.

Since 1992, the French Centre National d'Études Spatiales (CNES) has operated a satellite and rocket tracking station, located four kilometres (2 1/2 mi) east of Port-aux-Français. CNES needed a tracking station in the Southern Hemisphere, and the French government required that it be located on French territory, rather than in a populated, but foreign, place like Australia or New Zealand.

Agricultural activities were limited until 2007 to raising sheep (about 3,500 Bizet sheep, a breed that is rare in mainland France) on Longue Island for consumption by the occupants of the base, as well as small quantities of vegetables in a greenhouse within the immediate vicinity of the main French base. There are also feral rabbits and sheep that can be hunted, as well as wild birds.

There are also five fishing boats and vessels, owned by fishermen on Réunion Island (a department of France about 3,500 km or 1,900 nmi north) who are licensed to fish within the archipelago's exclusive economic zone.

== Geology ==
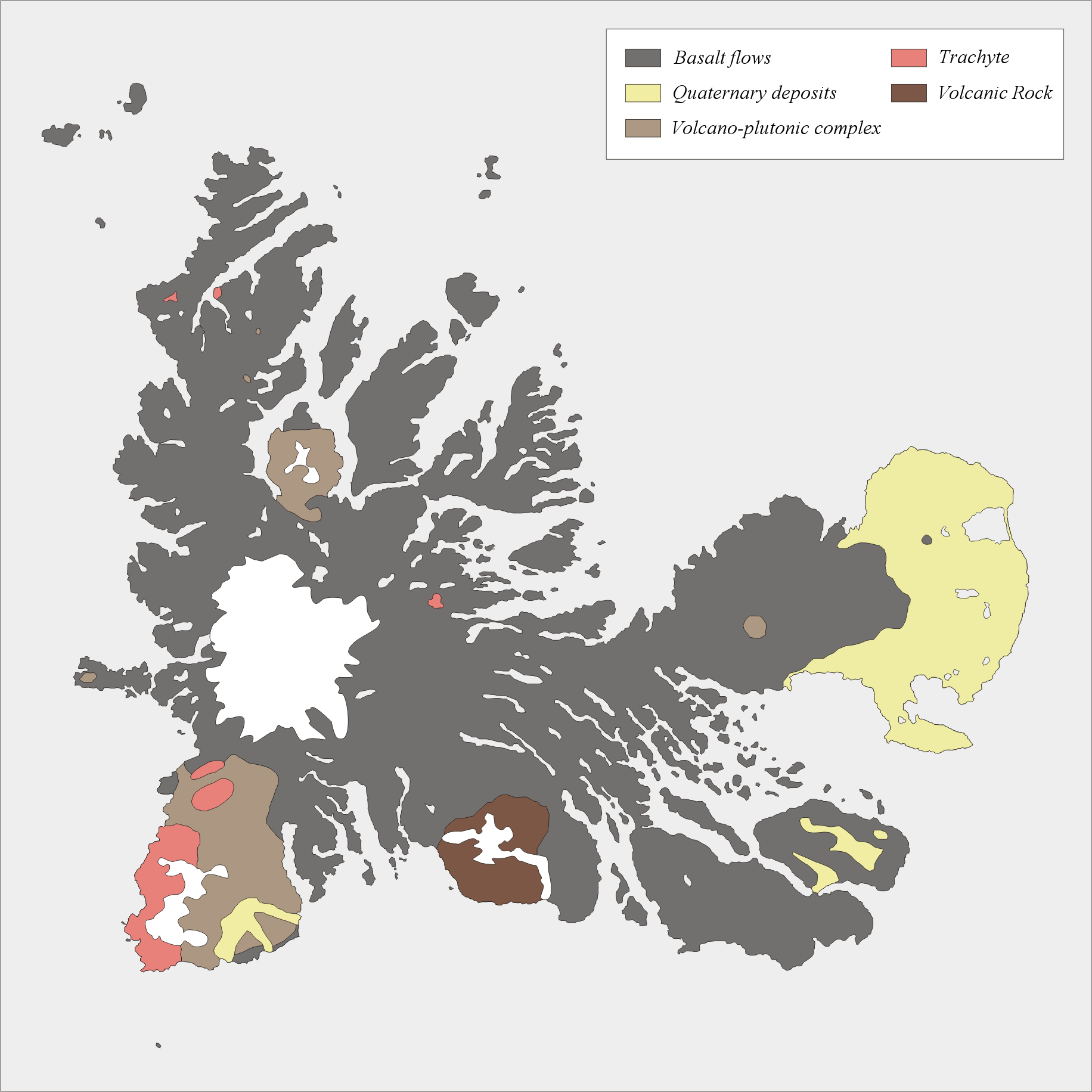
Simplified geological map of the Kerguelen Islands

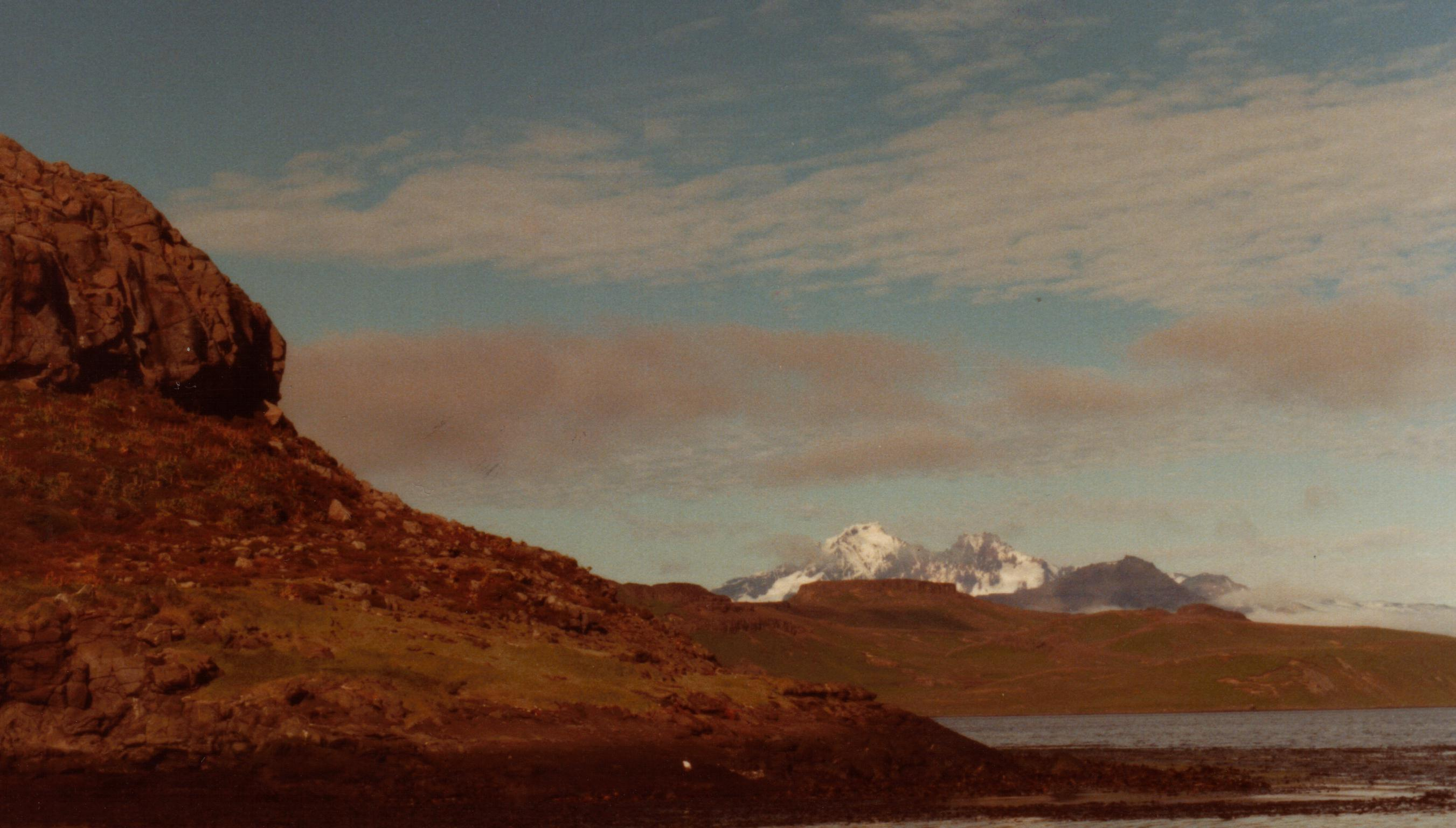
Mont Ross

The Kerguelen Islands form an emerged part of the submerged Kerguelen Plateau, which has a total area nearing 949,000 km^{2} (366,000 sq mi). The plateau was built by volcanic eruptions associated with the Kerguelen hotspot, and now lies on the Antarctic Plate.

The major part of the volcanic formations visible on the islands is characteristic of an effusive volcanism, which caused a trap rock formation to start emerging above the level of the ocean 35 million years ago. The accumulation is of a considerable amount; basalt flows, each with a thickness of three to ten metres, stacked on top of each other, sometimes up to a depth of 1,200 metres (660 fathoms). This form of volcanism creates a monumental relief shaped as stairs of pyramids.

Other forms of volcanism are present locally, such as the strombolian volcano Mont Ross, and the volcano-plutonic complex on the Rallier du Baty Peninsula. Various veins and extrusions of lava such as trachytes, trachyphonolites, and phonolites are common all over the islands.

No eruptive activity has been recorded in historic times, but some fumaroles are still active in the south-west of Grande-Terre island.

Fossilized wood found in the islands has been identified as Araucarians and Cypresses, showing that the islands were once forested with conifers. While an exact date for these wood fragments is unknown, they have been tentatively described as being from the early Cenozoic. The presence of these species may suggest that Kerguelen's prehistoric flora may have been similar to the Antarctic flora found across the southern hemisphere.

Glaciation caused the depression and tipping phenomena which created the gulfs at the north and east of the archipelago. Erosion caused by the glacial and fluvial activity carved out the valleys and fjords; erosion also created conglomerate detrital complexes, and the plain of the Courbet Peninsula.

The islands are part of a submerged microcontinent called the Kerguelen Subcontinent. The microcontinent emerged substantially above sea level for three periods between 100 million years ago and 20 million years ago. The Kerguelen Subcontinent may have had tropical flora and fauna about 50 million years ago. It finally sank 20 million years ago and is now one to two kilometres (550 to 1,100 fathoms) below sea level. Kerguelen's sedimentary rocks are similar to ones found in Australia and India, indicating they were all once connected. Scientists hope that studying the Kerguelen Subcontinent will help them discover how Australia, India, and Antarctica broke apart.

== Climate ==
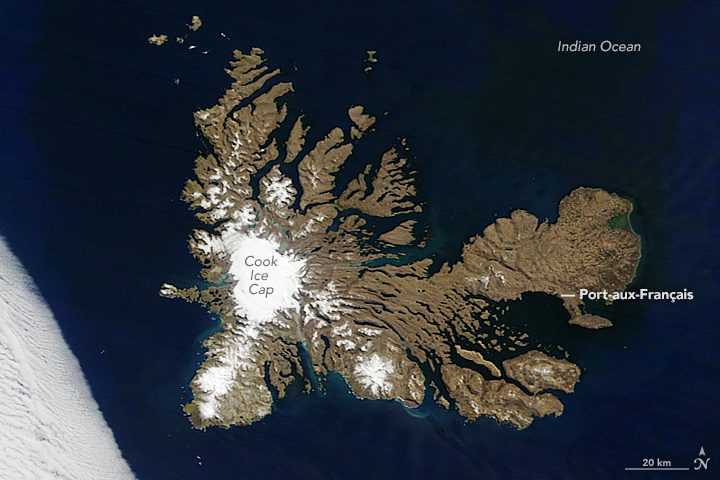
Kerguelen Islands from space, 2016

Kerguelen's climate is oceanic, cold, and extremely windswept. Under the Köppen climate classification, Kerguelen's climate is considered to be an ET or tundra climate, which is technically a form of polar climate, as the average temperature in the warmest month is below 10 °C (50 °F). Comparable climates include the Aleutian Islands, Campbell Island (New Zealand), Iceland, northern Kamchatka Peninsula (Russia), Labrador (Canada), and Wollaston Islands (Chile).

All climate readings come from the Port-aux-Français base, which has one of the more favourable climates in Kerguelen because of its proximity to the coast and its location in a gulf sheltered from the wind.

The average annual temperature is 4.9 °C (40.8 °F) with an annual range of around 6 °C (11 °F). The warmest months of the year include January and February, with average temperatures between 7.8 and 8.2 °C (46.0 and 46.8 °F). The coldest month of the year is August with an average temperature of 2.1 °C (35.8 °F). Annual high temperatures rarely surpass 20 °C (68 °F), while temperatures in winter have never been recorded below −10 °C (14 °F) at sea level.

Kerguelen receives frequent precipitation, with snow throughout the year as well as rain. Port-aux-Français receives a modest amount of precipitation (708 mm or 27 7/8 in per annum) compared to the west coast which receives an estimated three times as much precipitation per year.

The mountains are frequently covered in snow but can thaw very quickly in rain. Over the course of several decades, many permanent glaciers have shown signs of retreat, with some smaller ones having disappeared completely.

The west coast receives almost continuous wind at an average speed of 35 km/h (19 kn; 10 m/s) because the islands are between the Roaring Forties and the Furious Fifties. Wind speeds of 150 km/h (81 kn; 42 m/s) are common and can even reach 200 km/h (110 kn; 56 m/s).

Waves up to 12–15 m (39–49 ft) high are common, but there are many sheltered places where ships can anchor.

Comparison of local Meteorological data with other cities in France
Town	Sunshine (hours/yr)	Rain (mm/yr)	Snow (days/yr)	Storm (days/yr)	Fog (days/yr)
National average	1,973	770	14	22	40
Kerguelen	1,598.3	677.2	N/A	0.2	4.9
Paris	1,661	637	12	18	10
Nice	2,724	767	1	29	1
Strasbourg	1,693	665	29	29	56
Brest	1,605	1,211	7	12	75

Climate data for Kerguelen Islands (Port-aux-Français, 1991–2020 averages, extremes 1950–present)
Month	Jan	Feb	Mar	Apr	May	Jun	Jul	Aug	Sep	Oct	Nov	Dec	Year
Record high °C (°F)	25.8 (78.4)	23.6 (74.5)	22.3 (72.1)	23.1 (73.6)	16.8 (62.2)	14.5 (58.1)	13.2 (55.8)	15.0 (59.0)	15.8 (60.4)	19.1 (66.4)	19.9 (67.8)	22.1 (71.8)	25.8 (78.4)
Mean daily maximum °C (°F)	12.2 (54.0)	12.3 (54.1)	11.5 (52.7)	9.7 (49.5)	6.9 (44.4)	5.6 (42.1)	5.0 (41.0)	5.2 (41.4)	5.9 (42.6)	7.4 (45.3)	9.0 (48.2)	10.9 (51.6)	8.5 (47.3)
Daily mean °C (°F)	8.4 (47.1)	8.6 (47.5)	7.9 (46.2)	6.3 (43.3)	4.0 (39.2)	2.8 (37.0)	2.2 (36.0)	2.4 (36.3)	2.9 (37.2)	4.1 (39.4)	5.4 (41.7)	7.2 (45.0)	5.2 (41.4)
Mean daily minimum °C (°F)	4.7 (40.5)	4.9 (40.8)	4.2 (39.6)	3.0 (37.4)	1.2 (34.2)	0.1 (32.2)	−0.5 (31.1)	−0.4 (31.3)	−0.2 (31.6)	0.7 (33.3)	1.9 (35.4)	3.6 (38.5)	1.9 (35.4)
Record low °C (°F)	−1.5 (29.3)	−1.0 (30.2)	−2.2 (28.0)	−4.4 (24.1)	−7.2 (19.0)	−8.5 (16.7)	−8.9 (16.0)	−9.5 (14.9)	−7.6 (18.3)	−5.1 (22.8)	−4.4 (24.1)	−3.3 (26.1)	−9.5 (14.9)
Average precipitation mm (inches)	52.2 (2.06)	44.4 (1.75)	59.0 (2.32)	64.2 (2.53)	70.4 (2.77)	69.1 (2.72)	69.4 (2.73)	60.7 (2.39)	56.3 (2.22)	46.1 (1.81)	50.7 (2.00)	51.8 (2.04)	694.3 (27.33)
Average precipitation days (≥ 1.0 mm)	7.7	7.1	9.0	9.5	11.8	10.5	11.9	9.5	8.9	7.9	8.2	8.9	111.0
Mean monthly sunshine hours	187.2	158.4	145.6	114.5	95.3	74.7	85.8	106.5	128.2	153.4	166.6	182.3	1,598.3
Source: Météo France

== Flora and fauna ==
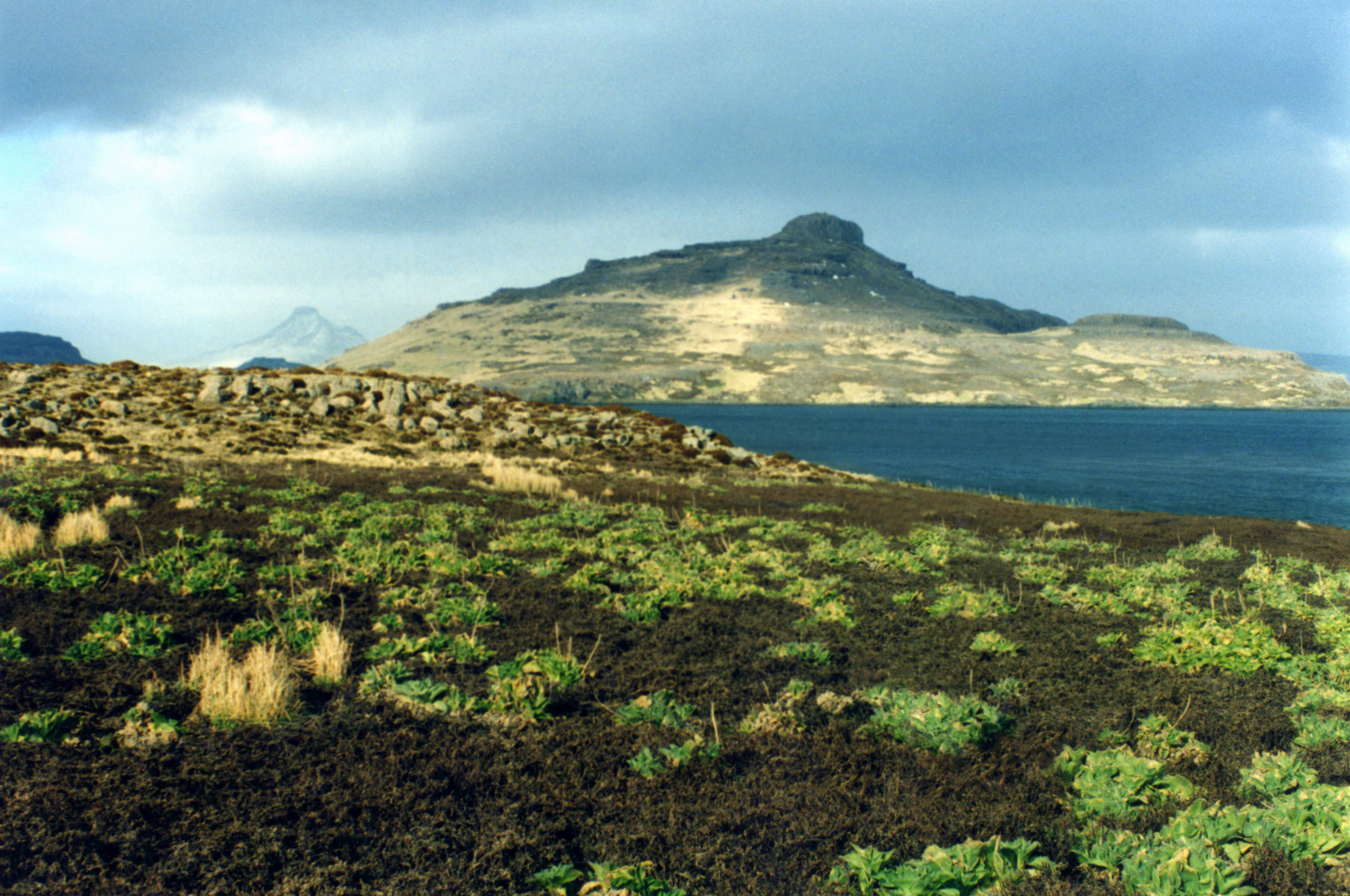
Kerguelen cabbages

The islands are part of the Southern Indian Ocean Islands tundra ecoregion that includes several subantarctic islands. Plant life is mainly limited to grasses, mosses, and lichens, although the islands are also known for the indigenous, edible Kerguelen cabbage, a good source of vitamin C to mariners. The main indigenous animals are insects along with large populations of ocean-going seabirds, seals, and penguins.

The wildlife is particularly vulnerable to introduced species; one particular problem has been cats. The main island is the home of a well-established feral cat population, descended from ships' cats. They survive on sea birds and the feral rabbits that were introduced to the islands. There are also introduced reindeer. A population of wild sheep (Ovis orientalis orientalis) was eradicated by 2012.

In the 1950s and 1960s, French geologist Edgar Albert de la Rue began to introduce several species of salmonids. Of the seven species introduced, only brook trout Salvelinus fontinalis and brown trout Salmo trutta survived to establish wild populations.

=== Coleoptera ===
- Carabidae
  - Oopterus soledadinus [introduced]
- Weevil
  - Palirhoeus eatoni [native]
- Hydraenidae
  - Meropathus chuni [endemic]

== In popular culture ==
The islands appear in a number of fictional works:

- In The Narrative of Arthur Gordon Pym of Nantucket (1838), Edgar Allan Poe's only complete novel, the crew of the Jane Guy alights at Kerguelen Island before eventually pushing on towards the South Pole.
- French writer Jules Verne's 1897 novel Le Sphinx des glaces (The Sphinx of the Ice Fields; translated into English as An Antarctic Mystery) offers a follow-up to Poe's book, and revisits the Kerguelen Islands, with the first chapter being titled "Les Îles Kerguelen".
- The 1874 short story The Tachypomp by Edward Page Mitchell tells of a hole through the centre of the Earth with one end in the United States and the other in "Kerguellen's Land". In fact the islands' antipodal point, 49°15′N 110°50′W, falls near Pakowki Lake, Alberta, Canada.
- G. A. Henty's 1886 novel A Chapter of Adventures, beginning on page 80, tells of a shipwrecked mariner's survival adventure on "Kerguelen Island".
- The novel Mr Meeson's Will (1888) by H. Rider Haggard tells the fate of five shipwrecked passengers, including a woman and a child, from a steamboat which sank on her way to New Zealand. These people manage to reach the Kerguelen Islands on a lifeboat where they struggle for their survival.
- Henry de Vere Stacpoole set his 1919 novel The Beach of Dreams on the islands.
- The islands inspired the 2008 song The Loneliest Place on the Map by singer Al Stewart.
- In the seafaring novel Desolation Island (1978), one of the Aubrey–Maturin series by Patrick O'Brian, the crew repair their disabled ship on an island that strongly resembles Kerguelen, although a later book in the series asserts that it this was a different Desolation Island, located somewhere "further south and east" (probably Heard Island, though this island was not confirmed to exist until the 1850s).
- In Biggles' Second Case (1948) by W. E. Johns, Biggles searches for Nazi gold just after World War II on and around Kerguelen.
- The novel The Lost Flying Boat (1984) by Alan Sillitoe is situated around Kerguelen, though the islands' geography is not accurately described.
- In Patrick Robinson's novel Kilo Class (1998), naval confrontations arise in the Kerguelen Islands between the Americans, the Chinese, and the Taiwanese.

== See also ==
- Administrative divisions of France
- List of Antarctic and subantarctic islands
- List of French overseas islands
- List of rivers of the Kerguelen Islands
- Overseas France
- Toponymy of the Kerguelen Islands
