= Golfe du Morbihan (Kerguelen) =

Coordinates: 49°26′S 70°8′E

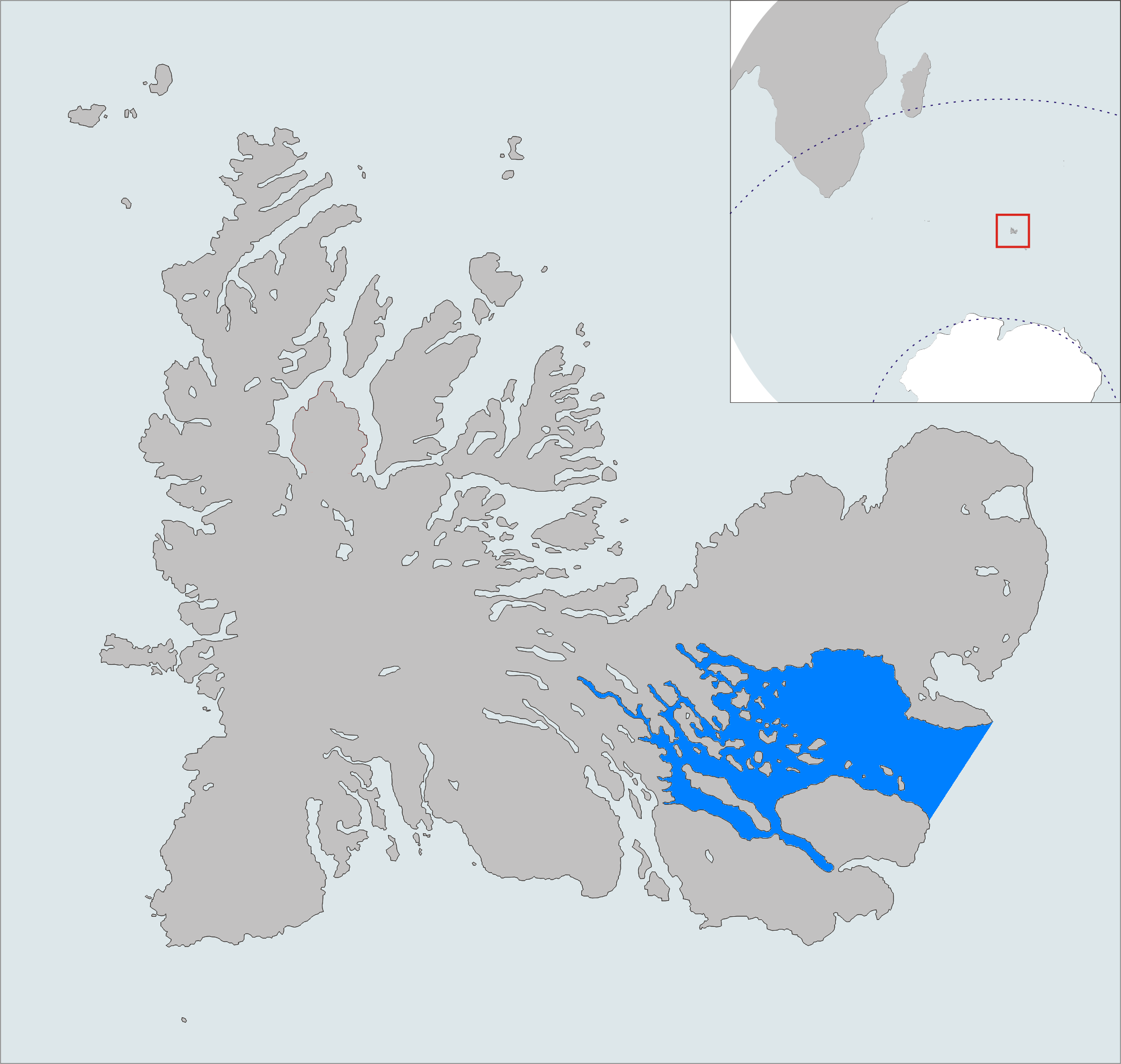
Location of the Golfe du Morbihan

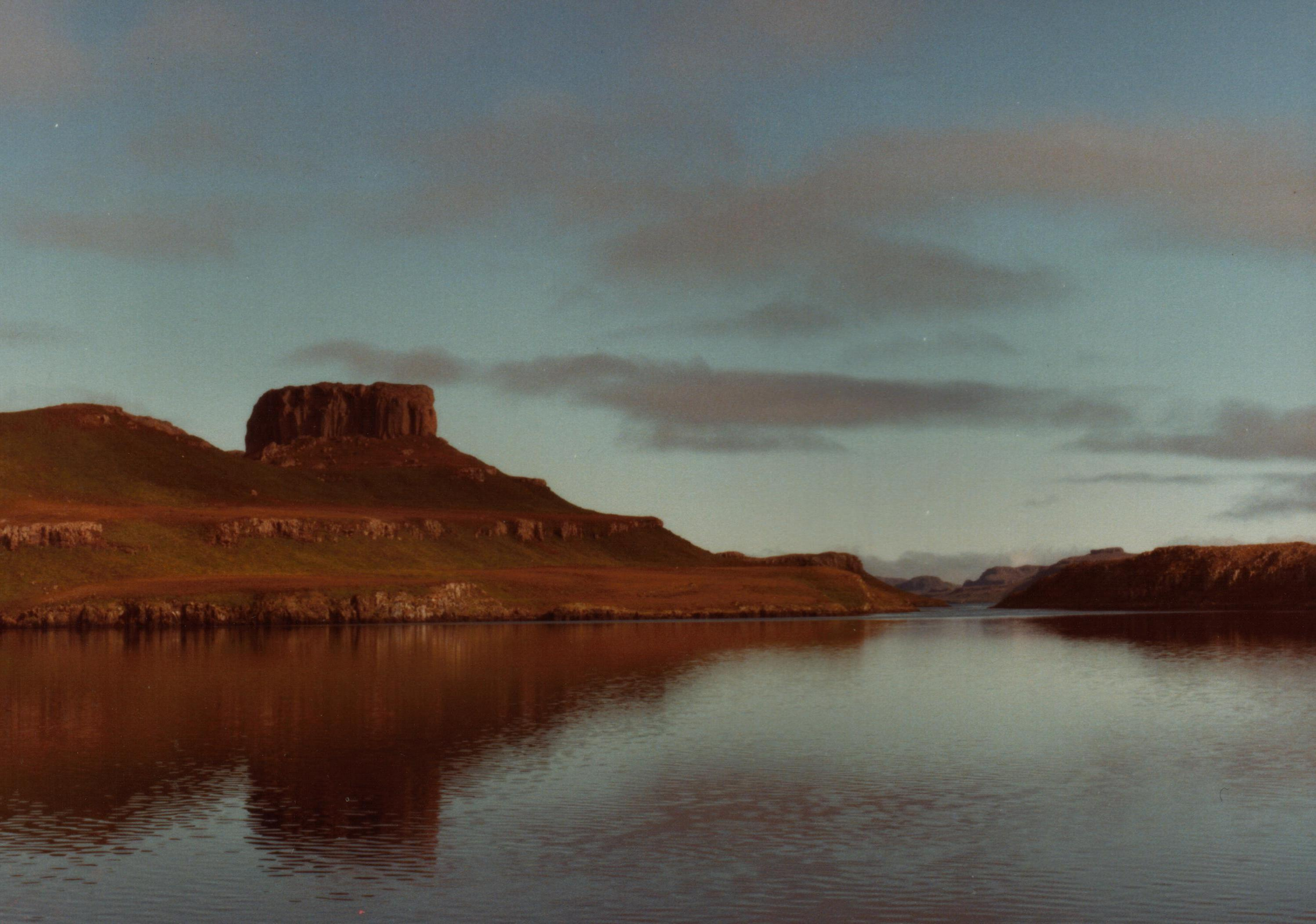

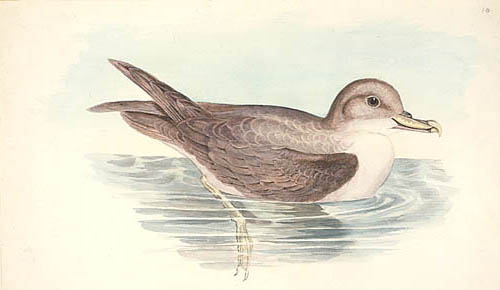
The islands of the gulf are important for nesting Grey Petrels

The Golfe du Morbihan (French pronunciation: [ɡɔlf dy mɔʁbiɑ̃], lit. 'Gulf of Morbihan') is a bay on the eastern coast of Grande Terre, the largest of the Kerguelen islands. It forms a deep and broad notch in the central section of the island.

== Description ==
It is a relatively protected maritime space constituting a natural shelter for the ships and on the banks of which were established the stations of Port-Jeanne-d'Arc and Port-aux-Français. The gulf of Morbihan is strewn with many islands and islets. It was thus so called by Raymond Rallier du Baty at the time of its forwardings of the beginning of the 20th century in the honour of the Gulf of Morbihan in Brittany (Kerguelen was Breton, and many of the features in the islands have Breton names). "Morbihan" derives directly from the Breton name which is Ar Morbihan, meaning 'the little sea' (Compare the Welsh y môr bychan), as opposed to the Ocean outside.

The name of Gulf of Morbihan appears on a chart published in 1922. Previously the place was known as Royal Sound, given by James Cook. This remains in the name of Passe Royale, the entry of the gulf. The name Golfe du Morbihan was confirmed by the French toponymy commission for the Southern and Antarctic Lands, thus respecting the hierarchy of the topographic terms, since the Golfe du Morbihan includes several smaller bays such as the Baie des Aurores Australes, where Port-aux-Français is located. However the name Baie du Morbihan appears on various charts and is often used indifferently even in official writings.

== Important Bird Area ==
The islands of the gulf have been identified by BirdLife International as a 280 km^{2} Important Bird Area (IBA) because of their value as breeding sites for seabirds and for Eaton's pintails. Of the 20 islands and numerous islets included in the IBA, the largest is the 20 km^{2} Île Australia. Some of the islands are free of introduced species, but others are infested by rats, mice and rabbits. Some islands still have their original subantarctic vegetation, including Kerguelen cabbages, lyallia cushions and Moseley's buttercups. They are of particular interest because of their large populations of blue and grey petrels. Other birds breeding in the IBA include Kerguelen, great-winged, white-chinned and white-headed petrels, Antarctic and slender-billed prions, Wilson's and grey-backed storm petrels, South Georgia and common diving petrels, Kerguelen shags, black-faced sheathbills, brown skuas and Kerguelen terns.
