= Raymond Rallier du Baty =

French sailor and explorer

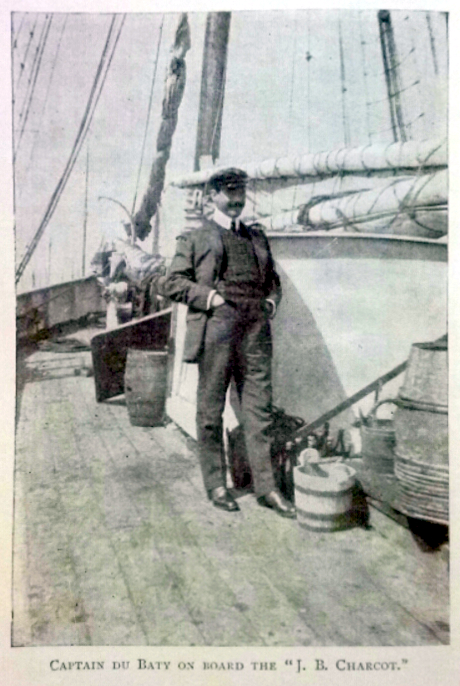
Captain du Baty on board the "J. B. Charcot" - From his book 15,000 Miles in a Ketch.

Raymond Rallier du Baty (French pronunciation: [ʁɛmɔ̃ ʁalje dy bati]; 30 August 1881 – 7 May 1978) was a French sailor and explorer, from Lorient in Brittany, who carried out surveys of the subantarctic Kerguelen Islands in the southern Indian Ocean in the early 20th century.

Rallier du Baty took part in the 1904-1907 Third French Antarctic Expedition led by Jean-Baptiste Charcot.

From September 1907 to July 1909 Captain Raymond Rallier du Baty sailed from Boulogne to Melbourne in a French fishing ketch, known as the J. B. Charcot. The J. B. Charcot weighed forty-eight tons and completed this trip in 15,000 miles. The reason for this voyage was primarily to chart the subantarctic Kerguelen Islands. Du Baty and his brother Henri du Baty funded this expedition by harvesting the oil of the southern elephant seals in the area. Raymond Rallier du Baty wrote a book detailing his experience on the J. B. Charcot, entitled 15,000 Miles in a Ketch.

They returned again in 1913-1914 in La Curieuse to carry out further surveys. These efforts led to the publication of the first full map of the archipelago in 1922.

Rallier du Baty is commemorated in several geographic features, including Péninsule Rallier du Baty in the Kerguelen Archipelago, and Rallier Island and Rallier Channel in the Wilhelm Archipelago of the Antarctic Peninsula.

Raymond Rallier du Baty's father was a commander in the French navy and his uncle was an admiral.

== Publications ==
- 1917 - 15,000 Miles in a Ketch. Thomas Nelson and Sons: London.
- 1946 - Dans l'ombre de Jean Charcot. Notes personnelles de R.Rallier du Baty transcrites et complètèes par Pierre Navarre. Arthaud: Paris. (In French).
- 1991 - Aventures aux Kerguelen. Ouest France. (A French translation of Fifteen Thousand Miles in A Ketch). ISBN 2-7373-0722-8

== See also ==
- La Tanche (ship), a research vessel under the command of Raymond Rallier du Baty from 1921 - 1928.
