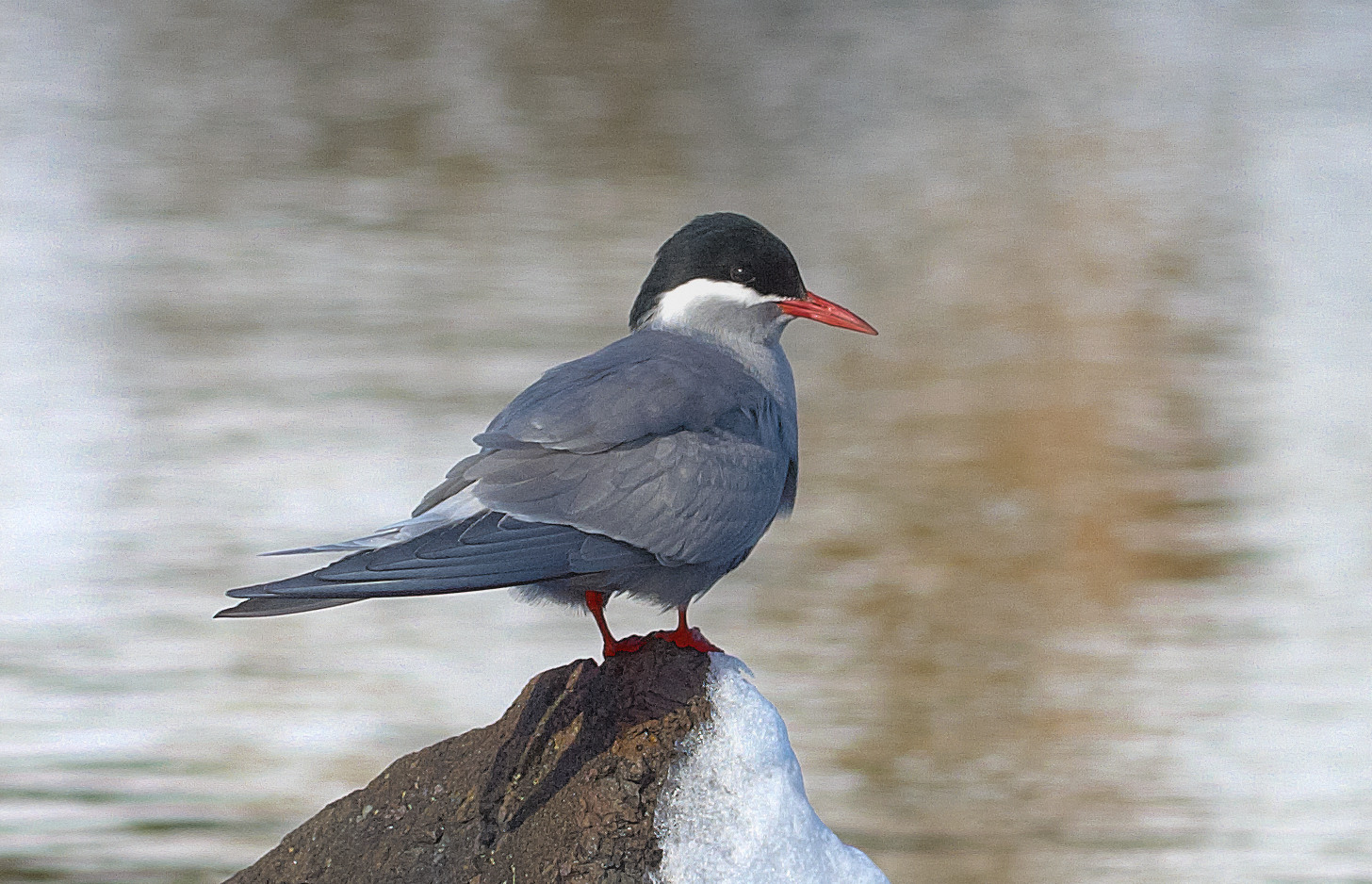
- Kerguelen tern

Conservation status
- Near Threatened (IUCN 3.1)

Scientific classification
- Kingdom: Animalia
- Phylum: Chordata
- Class: Aves
- Order: Charadriiformes
- Family: Laridae
- Genus: Sterna
- Species: S. virgata

Binomial name
- Sterna virgata Cabanis, 1875

= Kerguelen tern =

Species of bird

The Kerguelen tern (Sterna virgata) is a tern of the Southern Hemisphere.

This seabird mainly breeds colonially in the Kerguelen Islands, as its common name implies. However, smaller colonies are also found in the Prince Edward Islands (i.e. Prince Edward and Marion) and Crozet Islands. The total number of individuals is from 3,500 to 6,500 birds, although there is no recent data from the main colony at Kerguelen. These birds do not inhabit Kerguelen proper, instead nesting on islets free of feral cats. During bad weather, they are known to abandon their colonies.

Kerguelen terns are among the least-ranging of all typical terns. They generally do not reach far into the seas near their breeding grounds.

These birds eat fish and marine invertebrates, especially those found in beds of the seaweed Macrocystis spp. They sometimes also hunt insects on land and catch fish from rivers on Kerguelen.

There are two subspecies:

- S. v. mercuri (Voisin, 1971) – Crozet and Prince Edward Island's
- S. v. virgata (Cabanis, 1875) – Kerguelen Island
