= Toponymy of the Kerguelen Islands =

Archipelago in the southern Indian Ocean

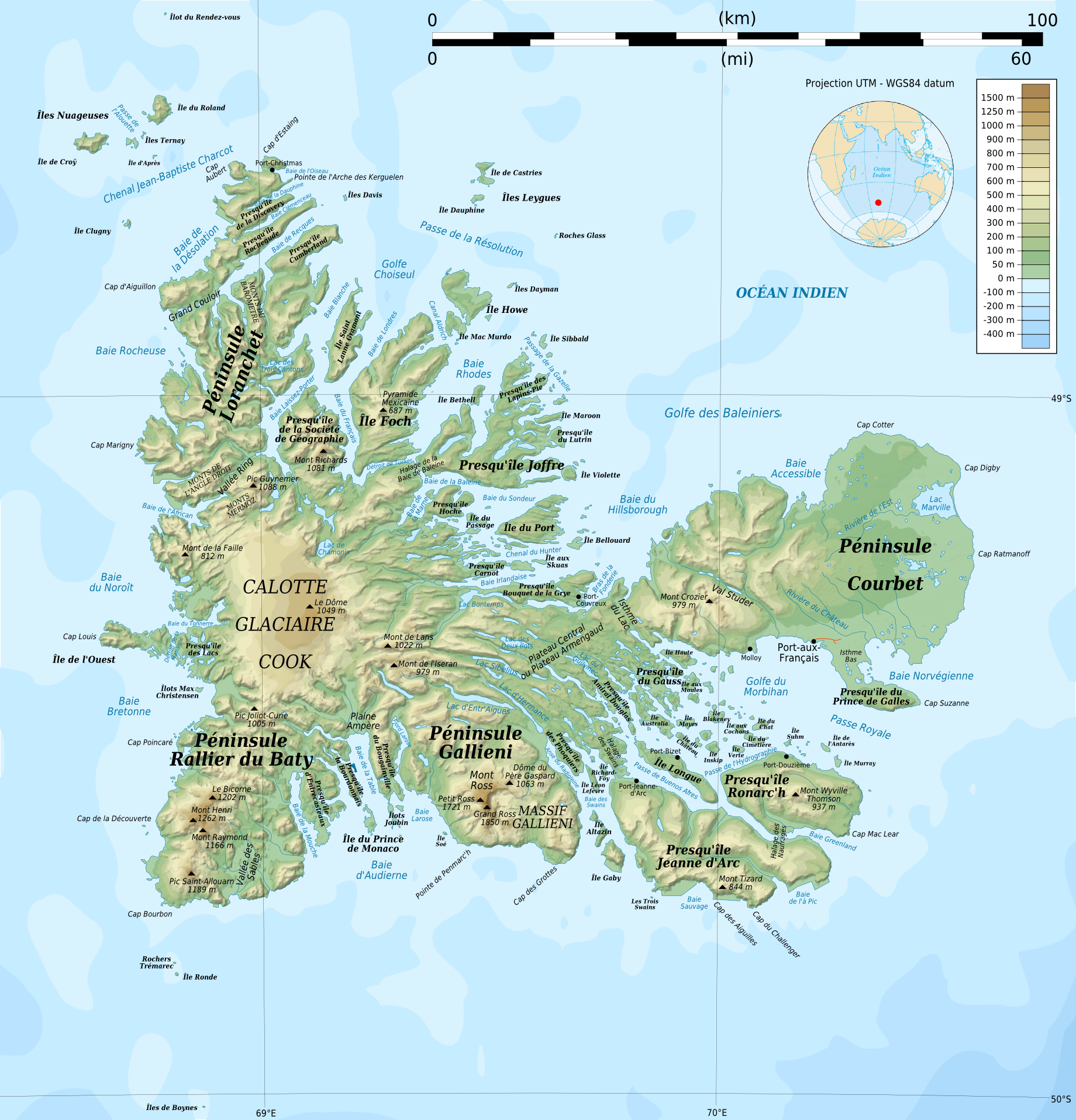
Kerguelen topographic map.

The Kerguelen Islands, an archipelago in the southern Indian Ocean, were discovered uninhabited on February 12, 1772 by Breton navigator Yves Joseph de Kerguelen de Trémarec, and have remained without a permanent population ever since. The only residents were during an attempt to set up a farm, a few occasional occupations for whaling activities, and since the 1950s, a French scientific presence. Its toponymy was thus given, starting from a blank page, by the various explorers, whalers and sealers who frequented its waters and anchorages, and then in the 20th century, once French possession of the archipelago had been reaffirmed, by a few French institutions.

According to historian Gracie Delépine, the place names of the Kerguelen Islands are "witnesses both to the gradual discovery made by Europeans, and to the intellectual civilization of those same Europeans. Over a thousand toponyms have been left on the archipelago by explorers, hunters, fishermen, scientists and navies from all over the world, from the time of its discovery in 1772 to the present day. In addition, they give a geographical portrait of the islands, as well as a zoological and botanical description: they make up their natural history.’’

== Toponymy by Yves Joseph de Kerguelen de Trémarec – 1772 and 1773 ==
The first toponymy of the archipelago, the names given by Yves Joseph de Kerguelen have almost all survived to the present day. This toponymy mainly derives from the names of the expedition's ships and officers, the navigator's native Brittany, the royal family, Kerguelen's patrons and ministers. For the latter, it's worth noting the political aspect of toponymy. While the first toponyms were drawn up by ministers in the court of Louis XV, the second expedition, after which Kerguelen sought rehabilitation, saw the names of new ministers in the court of Louis XVI appear. During these two expeditions, the island having been little explored, the coastal topography and remarkable points visible from the sea were named.

Here are a few examples:

- Pic Saint-Allouarn, named after Louis Aleno de Saint-Aloüarn, commander of the Gros Ventre, the expedition's second ship,
- Baie d'Audierne, after the Bay of Audierne in Brittany
- Golfe Choiseul, after Étienne-François de Choiseul, minister of Louis XV
- Île du Roland, from the Rolland, ship of the second expedition
- Îles de Boynes, named after the Marquis de Boynes, French Secretary of State for the Navy.
- Pointe Tromelin, named after the Chevalier de Tromelin, then Port-Louis port administrator.

== Toponymy of James Cook – 1776 ==
During his 1776 voyage, navigator James Cook sailed along the north, east, and southeast coasts of the archipelago, confirming its insularity. He commissioned his lieutenant, William Bligh, the future captain of HMS Bounty, to produce a map of the islands. The map gave some twenty toponyms to points or places visible from the sea. The most important of these is the name of the archipelago itself: îles de la Désolation, or terre de Kerguelen. The former name was used for over a century by American and British whalers and sealers, before falling into disuse; the latter was used by naval and scientific missions and became the sole name at the beginning of the 20th century.

Other toponyms given by Cook refer to members of the British royal family, British ministers of the time, scientists under his protection or some of his officers. There are also a few descriptive toponyms:

- Port-Christmas (Christmas Harbour), where Kerguelen docked and sheltered on his arrival in Kerguelen on Christmas Day 1776. Initially, the name had been given to what Kerguelen had named Baie de l'Oiseau (harbour ). But the name became so popular that it was subsequently retained in official toponymy, but only to refer to the site at the head of the bay.
- The Prince of Wales Peninsula, after the young Prince of Wales George Augustus of Hanover, the future George IV.
- Île Howe, after Lord Howe, then commander of the British armies in North America.
- Mont Campbell (north of the Courbet Peninsula), after Vice-Admiral John Campbell (and not George Campbell, lieutenant on the HMS Challenger during the 1879 expedition, as was thought for a while).
- Pointe Pringle (east of Loranchet Peninsula), named after the Scotsman Sir John Pringle, president of the Royal Society and a friend of Cook's.
- Pointe de l'Arche (now collapsed), north of the Loranchet Peninsula.
- Îles Nuageuses
- Passe Royale: Cook originally named the whole of what is now the Gulf of Morbihan Royal Sound, but the name remains today only for the pass that gives access to it. It is framed by Cape George (named after King George III) and Point Charlotte (named after his wife, Queen Charlotte).
- Baie blanche, the bay being "because of certain white areas of earth or rocks in the bottom of it",

== Toponymy of whalers and sealers ==
=== Map of Rhodes – 1799 ===
As soon as the maps drawn up by Kerguelen and especially Cook became known, the waters of the archipelago were frequented by British and especially American whalers and sealers, who named a number of places for their own use. These were descriptive names for fishing boats or barges. Some of these names were recorded on a handwritten map drawn by British captain Robert Rhodes, commanding the Hillsborough when he arrived in Kerguelen waters in 1799. This map (known as the "Rhodes map"), now held by the British Hydrographic Department, was used in 1840 by Sir James Clark Ross, who arrived with the Erebus and Terror in 1840. Recopied, it was also used by the commander of the Challenger in 1874, who gave it to the commander Fairfax of the Volage, who in turn passed it on to the German commander of La Gazelle, enabling us to find certain names, gallacised, in today's toponymy. These include:

- Baie Accessible
- Baie du Hillsborough
- Anse du Bon coin (Snugg Corner Cove)
- Baie des Cascades (north of Courbet Peninsula, in Baie Accessible). The original name was Cascade River, meaning both the river (currently, Rivière du Nord) cascading down from the Chateau Mountains and the narrow bay into which it emptied.
- Anse Betsy (or Betsey, north of the Courbet peninsula, in Baie Accessible), probably the name of a hunting boat, a common name at the time.
- Port d'Hiver
- Brisants Kent (north of Baie Accessible), probably the name of a whaling ship.
- Baie de l'Éclipse (on the east coast of the presqu'île Joffre), probably the name of a whaling or sealing vessel.
- Île du Port, in Baie du Hillsborough
- Pointe aux Œufs (tip of Île Violette, in the Gulf of Whales), an important nesting site.

== Nunn's map – 1850 ==
The English hunter John Nunn was shipwrecked off the Kerguelens in 1825. He published his account in 1850, accompanied by a map of the archipelago's rough contours. The map bears some forty names, probably used by whalers and sealers at the time of the shipwreck. Some thirty of them have survived and evoke, often with originality, the life, and its harshness, of sailors at the time. They include:

- Ravin du Bol de Punch du Diable (Devils Punch Bowl, on the western shore of Baie du Centre, on the Loranchet Peninsula), depicts the tormented relief of a valley reminiscent of a slag heap in a furnace.
- Pointe du Cuir Salé (west coast of Loranchet Peninsula)
- Rochers du Désespoir (northern coast of the Courbet peninsula, at the entrance to the bay.
- Crique du Sac à Plomb (Shot Bag Bay, in Baie du Noroît, southwest of Loranchet Peninsula), evokes this important object in the life of 19th-century hunters.
- Baie Laissez-Porter (Bear up Bay, southeast of the Loranchet peninsula), evokes a particularly well-protected and calm bay.

This last toponym shows the difficulty of francization. Bear up Bay was first translated in 1913 on the French Navy map as "Baie Laissez-Porter", then in 1915 as "Baie du Repos". In 1922, in La Géographie, Rallier du Baty explains: "This name is difficult to translate. "To bear up" in maritime English means "to let carry", as opposed to "to luff" or "to heave", which means "to loft": "to come upright to the wind". It was translated again in 1970 by the Commission de toponymie into " Baie Laissez-Porter ", its current name.

== James Clark Ross map – 1840 ==
During his expedition to Antarctica, the British explorer James Clark Ross passed through the Kerguelen Islands in 1840. He drew up a fairly accurate map showing the toponyms in use at the time among whalers and sealers, a toponymy that was becoming increasingly abundant. For example, his map includes the names, then in English, of:

- Île Longue
- Île Verte
- Île Noire,
- Plage de la Demi-Lune,
- Trou du Ressac.

Ross himself names only three places:

- Baie Rhodes
- Récifts du Terror, the HMS Terror is one of the two ships on the expedition with the HMS Erebus
- Club-Moss Bay (today Anse aux Choux), club-moss is the common English name for the Lycopodiopsida whose physician on theErebus, the second ship of the expedition, had discovered new species in the vicinity only.

Other names related to this expedition were given following the Challenger expedition in 1874.

== Toponymy during the Challenger expedition – 1874 ==
The Challenger expedition, a British scientific mission led by Professor Charles Wyville Thomson, aboard Captain Nares' HMS Challenger, visited Kerguelen in January 1874. The expedition attributed some fifty toponyms, most of which still exist today. Twenty-two are named after members of the Erebus and Terror expeditions, including Mont Ross, the highest point in the archipelago, named after James Clark Ross, Mont Tizard, after Thomas Henry Tizard, oceanographer and lieutenant on the Challenger, as well as Mont Richards. A British Admiralty hydrographer, J. Evans, will also be honored with Mont Evans, the distinctive, steep mountain south of the Jeanne d'Arc Peninsula.

The British astronomical mission that came to observe the transit of Venus between November 1874 and February 1875 aboard the Volage and Supply also left its mark.

== Toponymy of the German La Gazelle mission – 1874 ==
A German astronomical mission, led by Dr Börgen, was aboard La Gazelle from October 1874 to February 1875. They set up a canvas camp on the edge of Betsy Cove, at the head of Accessible Bay. The ship carried out hydrographic surveys of the northeast coast of the archipelago. The mission assigned some fifty toponyms, named after crew members and mission scientists, as well as the great Prussian figures of the time, such as Bismarck, Kaiser and Kronprintz. In 1915, during the First World War, the French Navy's Hydrographic Service removed all those that reminded them of the enemy, for example more than twenty. Twenty-three remain in today's toponymy, francized for descriptive toponyms.

=== List of place names given by the La Gazelle mission ===
- Astronomes (Baie des)
- Beau Temps (Havre du)
- Bobzien (Îlots)
- Breusing (Pointe)
- Cachée (Baie)
- Credner (Port)
- Dimanche (Port)
- Gazelle (Bassin de la)
- Gazelle (Passage de la)
- Hélène (Port)
- Husker (Passe)
- Krille (Pointe)
- Louise (Port)
- Margot (Lac)
- Marie (Port)
- Milieu (Port du)
- Naumann (Glacier)
- Neumayer (Cap)
- Passage (Îles du)
- Rosa (Port)
- Studer (Val)
- Toit (Mont du)
- Victoria (Bassin)

== Work of the Toponymy Commission – 1966 to 1971 ==
In 1966, Pierre Rolland, Superior Administrator of the TAAF, entrusted the validation of the toponymy of the Austral lands to a commission created by decree N°.16 of June 27, 1966. It was made up of four members appointed by him:

- Hervé Durand de Corbiac, chief engineer-geographer at IGN,
- A. Duthu, Captain, Naval Hydrographic Service
- Jacques Nougier, lecturer at the Sorbonne, geologist
- Gaston Rouillon, deputy director, French Polar Expeditions (EPF)

Gracie Delépine, curator at the Bibliothèque de documentation internationale contemporaine in Paris, was in charge of carrying out the necessary bibliographical research and drawing up the corresponding files.

The commission held ten meetings between December 1966 and May 1971, with Mr. Roly, the TAAF administrator's representative, in attendance.

It endeavored to follow five rules:

- pre-eminence of the French language for the naming of surnames constituting simple geographical designations.
- maintenance of names given during missions prior to 1950.
- respect for the blanks on the map at the time, with new toponyms left to the care of the future teams who will carry out the reconnaissance.
- avoid names relating to living persons given after 1950, except in the case of heads of state or eminent personalities.
- favor names to honor a departed personality or expedition member, commemorate a road incident, the passage of a ship, highlight a resemblance, recall a metropolitan geographical name, events in local life, etc.

It was based on the map of Kerguelen produced by the Institut Géographique National (IGN, by its French acronym) between 1964 and 1967.

These campaigns attributed twenty-six names, which were taken up by the Commission:

=== List of toponyms provided by the IGN team of geographers ===
- Aiguille Noire (L')
- Blanc (Lac)
- Bout de l'An (Crête du)
- Brumes (Mont des)
- Chaotique (Mont)
- Cratère (Éperon du)
- Déroute (Monts de la)
- Deux Frères (Les)
- Écume (Anse de l')
- Grésil (Mont du)
- Kiosque (Le)
- Malchance (Lac de la)
- Mécaniciens (Col des)
- Méridien (Table du)
- Mirador (Le)
- Montjoie (La)
- Niñas (Île)
- Perdu (Lac)
- Perdu (Mont)
- Porte du Vent (La)
- Quatre Mares (Les)
- Quatre Points (Mont des)
- Retour (Val du)
- Secours (Col du)
- Trois Vallées (Les)
- Visée (Col de la)

=== List of toponyms given by the Commission de toponymie ===
- Aéronavale (Monts de l')
- Aglaé (Lac)
- Ailefroide (L')
- Alicia (Lac)
- Alidade (Mont de l')
- Amphi (Glacier de l')
- Amphi (Rivière de l')
- Aphrodite (Lac)
- Aramis (Mont)
- Arènes (Les)
- Armengaud (Plateau)
- Artagnan (Monts d')
- Arve (L')
- Astronomie (Pointe de l')
- Athéna (Lac)
- Athos (Mont)
- Atlantis (Roche de l')
- Auge (Val d')
- Austral (Lac)
- Aval (Lac)
- Baignoire (Lac de la)
- Baleines Noires (Anse des)
- Balthazar (Mont)
- Barrabé (Glacier)
- Bas (Piste du)
- Bastille (La)
- Bastion (Le)
- Beaulieu (Table de)
- Bedja (Îlot)
- Béliers (Étang des)
- Belzébuth (Anse de)
- Berlioz (Mont)
- Besace (Lac de la)
- Bessons (Les)
- Blizzard (Col du)
- Börgen (Lac)
- Bornes (Mont des)
- Bouchet (Lac du)
- Bougainville (Presqu'île du)
- Brèche (Lac de la)
- Brunehilde (Lac)
- Calliope (Mont)
- Camaret (Anse de)
- Camargue (La)
- Camp (Glacier du)
- Camp de César (Le)
- Canot (Pointe du)
- Capitole (Le)
- Castor et Pollux
- Centaures (Étang des)
- Chamonix (Lac de)
- Chapelle (Colline de la)
- Chasseneige (Mont)
- Chasseurs (Rivière des)
- Château d'If (Le)
- Château-Gaillard
- Chaton (Îlot du)
- Chicanes (Rivière des)
- Chionis (Port du)
- Claire (La Roche)
- Claudine (Lac)
- Collets (Étang des)
- Commandant Loranchet (Île du)
- Cornue (Lac de la)
- Courmayeur (Lac de)
- Courtine (La)
- Cratère (La Table du)
- Cratère (Pic du)
- Crêtes (Piste des)
- Crozet (Mont)
- Cuvier (Glacier)
- Daniel Barbier (Mont)
- Décharge (Étang de la)
- Découverte (Cap de la)
- Désolation (Baie de la)
- Deux Bénitiers (Mont des)
- Deux Îlots (Lac des)
- Diable (Col du)
- Discovery (Presqu'île de la)
- Dombes (Les)
- Dôme (Le)
- Donatien Cot (Cap)
- Donjon (Le)
- Doris (Lac)
- Double (Mont)
- Doudart-de-Lagrée (Hauts-Fonds du)
- Dragons (Étang des)
- Duguay-Trouin (Anse)
- Durvillea (Anse des)
- Eaton (Lac)
- Écubier (Lac de l')
- Éliane (Lac)
- Espérance (Pointe de l')
- Entrecasteaux (Presqu'île d')
- Entrelacs (Val des)
- Épaves (Plage des)
- Équerre (Val d')
- Éridan (Étang)
- Étrave (L')
- Euphrosine (Lac)
- Explorateur (Glacier de l')
- Faille (Col de la)
- Faille (Mont de la)
- Fallot
- Fauve (Mont)
- Fente (Lac de la)
- Fer à Cheval (Mont du)
- Filon (Mont du)
- Flaques (Plateau des)
- Français (Baie du)
- Francès (Île de la)
- Gabiers (Anse des)
- Gaillard (Cap du)
- Gallieni (Roches du)
- Gaspard (Mont)
- Gendarme (Glacier du)
- Géodes (Plateau des)
- Géographe (Col du)
- Gergovie (Mont)
- Glacé (Col)
- Godet (Le)
- Grâces (Mont des)
- Gracie (Étang)
- Grand Balcon (Le)
- Grande Barrière (La)
- Grande Bastide (La)
- Grande Casse (La)
- Grand Étang (Le)
- Grand Plateau (Le)
- Grand Rempart (Le)
- Grand Téton (Le)
- G.R.I. (Étang du)
- Guéridon (Le)
- Guillou (Île)
- Halage (Anse du)
- Hautes Mares (Les)
- Hémicycle (Mont de l')
- Héra (Lac)
- Iceberg (Anse de l')
- Impasse (Lac de l')
- Infernet (Glacier de l')
- Isabelle (Presqu'île)
- Jacques Boucart (Anse)
- Jaspes (Lac des)
- Jaspes (Mont des)
- Jeannel (Cap)
- Joliot-Curie (Pic)
- Jussieu (Glacier)
- La Bourdonnais (Presqu'île)
- Lacs (Presqu'île des)
- Larmor (Vallée de)
- Larzac (Plateau du)
- Levant (Îlot du)
- Levant (Val du)
- Limnigraphe (Étang du)
- Lions Marins (Plage des)
- Macrocystis (Anse des)
- Magnétisme (Étang du)
- Marais (Le)
- Marches (Les)
- Marion Dufresne (Mont)
- Marjolaine (Lac)
- Maroon (Île)
- Mawson (Monts)
- Médoc (Lac)
- Megalestris (Lac des)
- Méjean (Plateau)
- Melchior (Mont)
- Mercure (Lac)
- Météo (Étang de la)
- Milady (Rivière)
- Mille Névés (Les)
- Mischief (Roche du)
- Moraines (Plaine des)
- Mortadelle (La)
- Moseley (Cirque)
- Mouflons (Table des)
- Moules (Île aux)
- Mousse (Anse du)
- Nathalie (Lac)
- Neiges (Piton des)
- Névés (Plateau des)
- Nicole (Lac)
- Noroît (Baie du)
- Oppidium (L')
- Ornithologue (Pointe de l')
- Orographie (Pointe de l')
- Ossau (Val d')
- Ouest (Le Pas de l')
- Ouest (Val de l')
- Pacha (Anse du)
- Pâris (Mont)
- Parsifal (Lac)
- Pascal (Glacier)
- Patanela (Cap du)
- Perché (Val)
- Petit Saint-Hubert (Étang du)
- Phoquiers (Presqu'île des)
- Pierre Lejay (Mont)
- Pilatte (Glacier de la)
- Podium (Le)
- Poincaré (Cap)
- Ponant (Cap du)
- Porthos (Mont)
- Poterne (Col de la)
- Proue (La)
- Pylones (Étang des)
- Quarantaine (Éperon de la)
- Rambarde (La)
- Raoul Blanchard (Glacier)
- Rapides (Val des)
- Ravines (Les)
- Recherche (Col de la)
- Renée (Lac)
- Réserve (Lac de la)
- Résolution (Passe de la)
- Rhèmes (Val de)
- Rhigi (Le)
- Robert Bureau (Mont)
- Rois Mages (Les)
- Rubis (Étang des)
- Sabot (Lac du)
- Saint-Hubert (Étang)
- Saint-Sylvestre (Mont)
- Saturne (Lac)
- Saumons (Lac des)
- Sauveterre (Plateau de)
- Schleinitz (Mont von)
- Sélé (Glacier du)
- Sérail (Rivière du)
- Sersey (Roche)
- Signal (Mont du)
- Sinaï (Mont)
- Six Lacs (Rivière des)
- Skuas (Île aux)
- Soc (Le)
- Stoll (Îlot)
- Styx (Le)
- Supérieur (Lac)
- Table de l'Oiseau (La)
- Table Haute (Mont de la)
- Taupinière (La)
- Telluromètre (Vallée du)
- Tempêtes (Falaise des)
- Terres Froides (Les)
- Thalie (Lac)
- Tigre (Lac du)
- Timoniers (Anse des)
- Tirelire (Mont de la)
- Tournelle (La)
- Tournesol (Roche)
- Travers (Val)
- Tremplin (Le)
- Trois Ménestrels (Les)
- Truites (Lac des)
- Tuillière (Roches)
- Uranie (Mont)
- Vallée Haute (La)
- Vanhöffen (Bras)
- Vendéenne (Lac de la)
- Ventoux (Mont)
- Vénus (Mont de)
- Véronique (Crête)
- Verrou (Le)
- Vieux Port (Le)
- Vigie (Mont de la)
- Virgule (Lac)
- Vulcain (La Coulée de)
- Weazels (Côte des)
- Weineck (Mont)

The commission will assign 270 names.

Gaston Rouillon, who carried out Gravimètre work on the archipelago in 1961, had already left three toponyms: l'anse de la Caverne, éperon du Gravimètre and la Butte Rouge.

== Bibliography ==
- Gracie, Delépine (1973). Toponymie des Terres australes (in French). Terres australes et antarctiques françaises / La Documentation française.
- Garde, François (2018). Marcher à Kerguelen. Blanche (in French). éditions Gallimard. ISBN 9782070148851.
