= Baie de l'Oiseau =

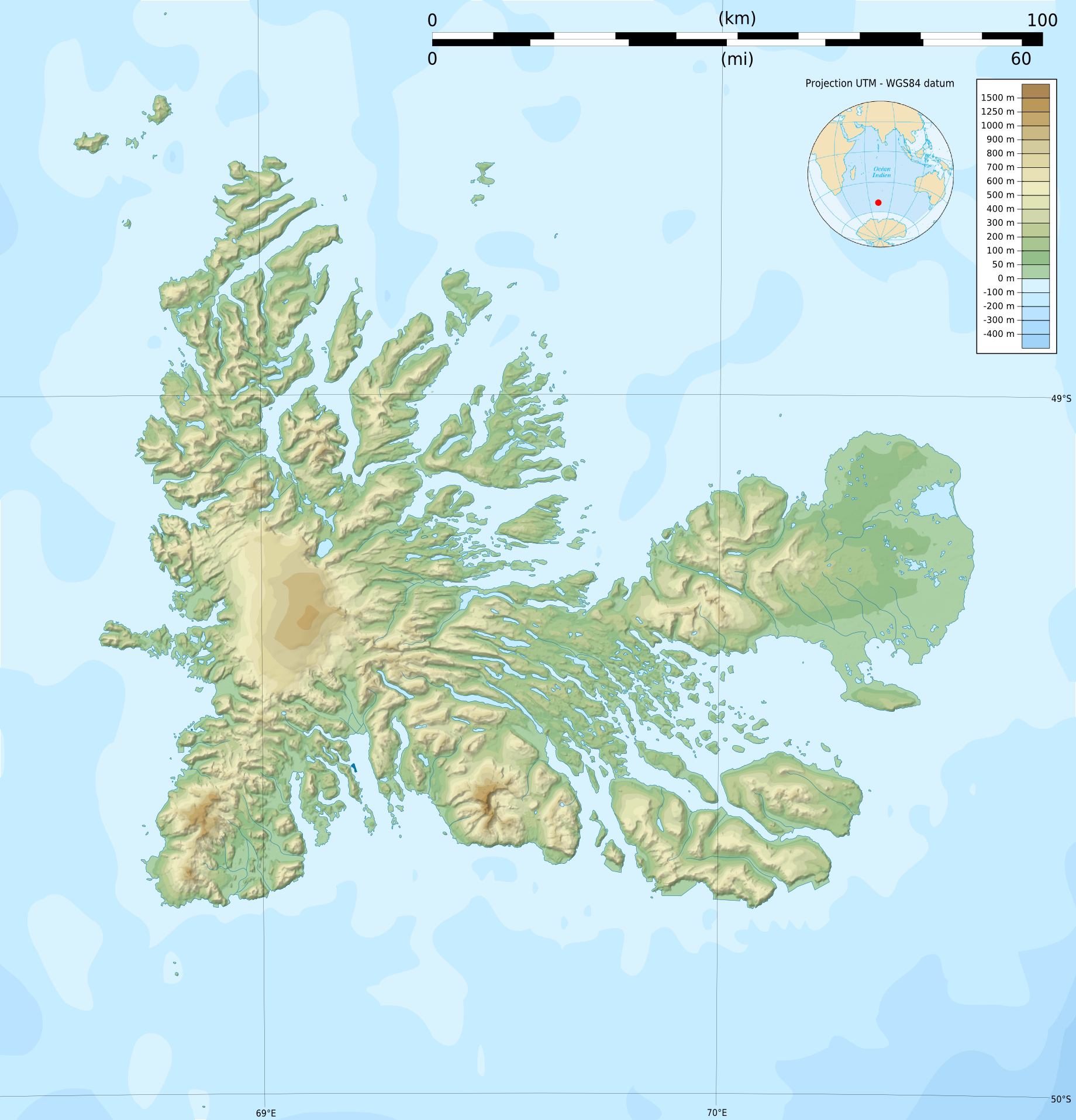
- Location in Kerguelen
- Location: French Southern and Antarctic Lands
- Coordinates: 48.685°S 69.052°E
- Ocean/sea sources: Indian Ocean
- Max. length: 3.8 km (2.4 mi)
- Max. width: 2.1 km (1.3 mi)

Baie de l'Oiseau (French pronunciation: [bɛ də lwazo], Bird Bay) is a natural harbour in the Loranchet Peninsula, in the northwestern part of the island Grande Terre, part of the Kerguelen Islands. It was the landing site of the expedition under Yves de Kerguelen in 1772, and later of the expedition under James Cook in 1776. The site of Port-Christmas is part of the bay.

== Geography ==
The bay is located at the extreme North of the Kerguelen archipelago, and open towards the east, between Cap Français at the north, and the cape of Kerguelen Arch which closes it on the south, and distinguishes it from the neighbouring Baie de la Dauphine. It is 3.8 kilometres (2.4 mi) long and 2.1 km (1.3 mi) wide at its largest. The 552-metre (1,811 ft) Mont Havergal dominates the site and shelters it from the wind. In the 19th century, it was used as a haven for whaling and seal hunting ships.

== Discovery ==
Kerguelen could see the side during his first voyage in February 1772, but could not land, and anchored at the South, in Baie du Lion-Marin, where he claimed the archipelago for France. In his second voyage, in December 1773, he entered the harbour and named in Baie de l'Oiseau, after the frigate Oiseau, under Rosnovet, one of the ships of the expedition. On 6 January 1774, he sent Rochegude ashore to leave a bottle with a message claiming the site for France. On 2 January 1893, Commander Lieutard, of the aviso Eure, renewed the claim.

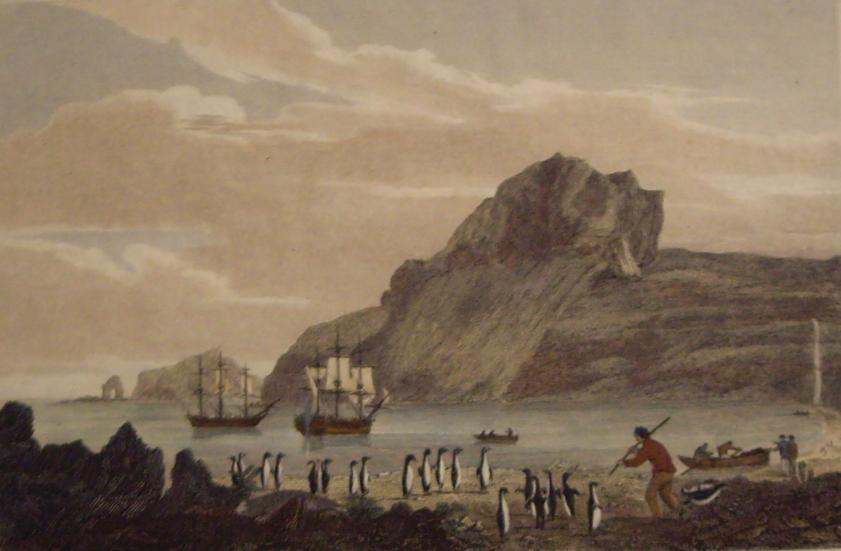
Arrival of James Cook in 1776 (engraving by John Webber, 1784).

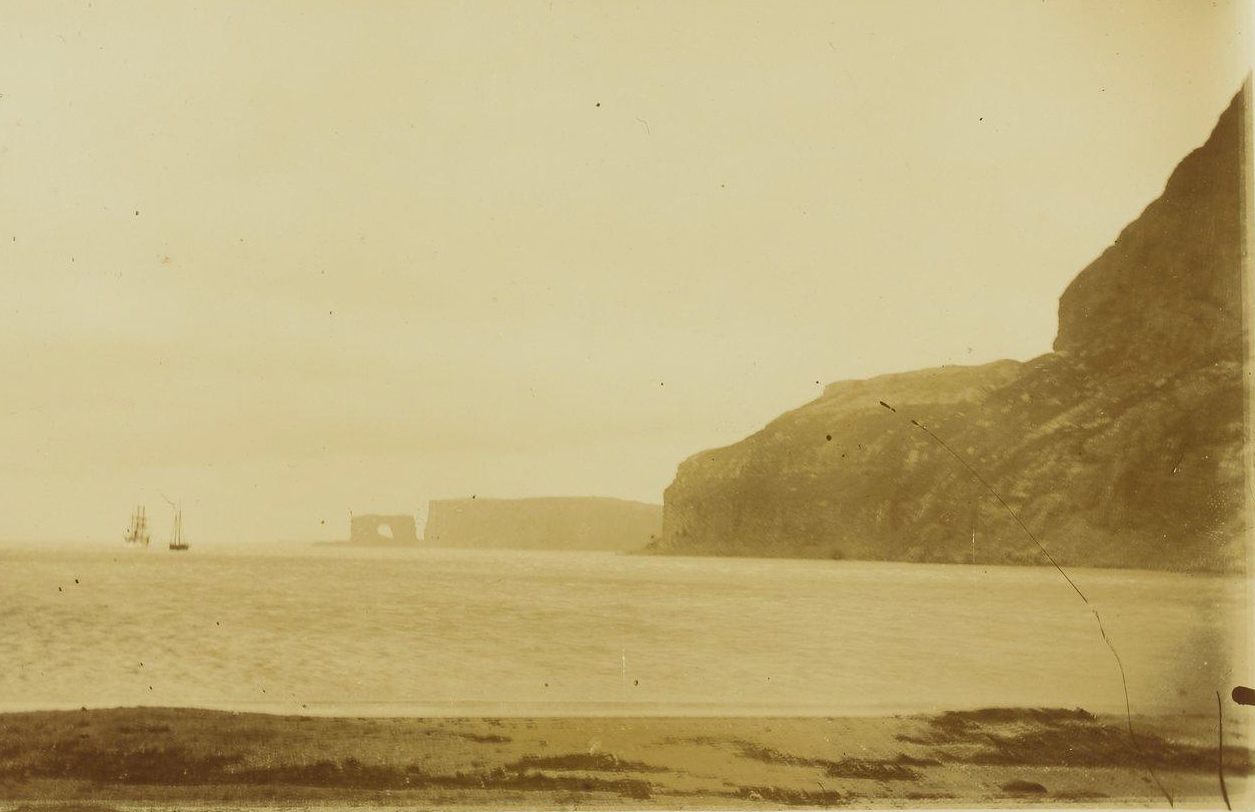
Baie de l'oiseau photographed by the aviso Eure on 2 January 1893, when France claimed the territory. The Kerguelen Arch is visible in the background.

== Fauna and flora ==
The flora is limited to moss and lichens in a tundra ecosystem, as well as a cane grass at the mouth of the spillway of Lake Rochegude. There are no trees or bushes, which inspired Cook to call the Islands "Desolation islands" when he visited in 1776. However, his surgeon, William Anderson, had noted the existence of Pringlea at the Bay, a source of vitamin C of interest at a time when scurvy was a common sanitary problem for sailors. During the Ross expedition of 1840, Doctor McCormick, exploring Mount Havergal, found fossilised tree trunk, proving the existence of forests in a previous geological era.

The bay is home to temporary colonies of king penguins and a variety of other birds, such as petrels or albatrosses, which nest in the cliffs of the bay, as well as colonies of South American sea lions and southern elephant seal. Rabbits were deliberately introduced in 1874, and have since been observed in the cliffs of Port-Christmas. Southern right whales have also been seen near the bay, and on the northwestern shores of the archipelago.
