= Mont Havergal =

Mountain in the Kerguelen Islands, French Southern and Antarctic Lands

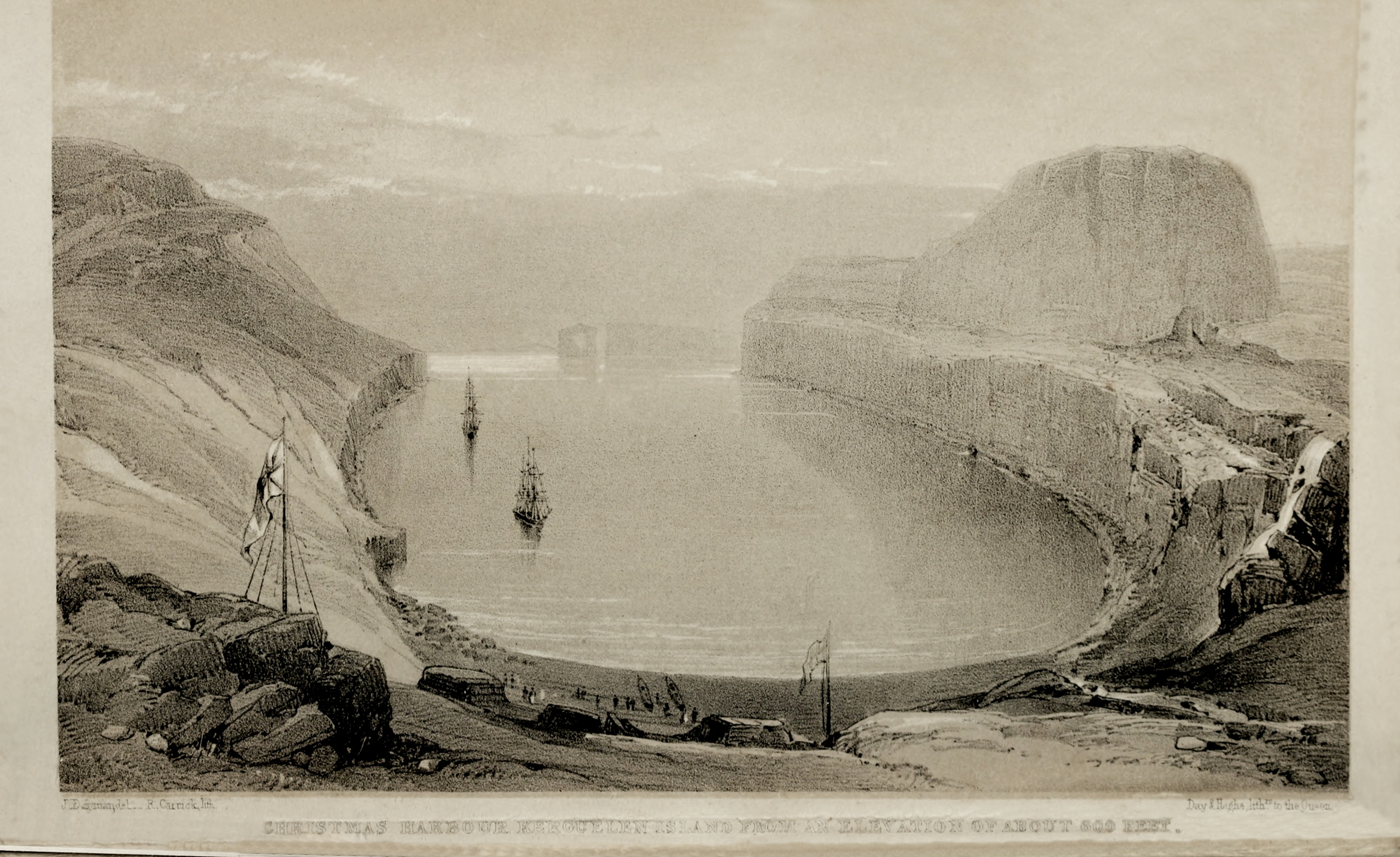
- 19th century picture of Port-Christmas with Mont Havergal on the right

Highest point
- Elevation: 552 m (1,811 ft)
- Coordinates: 48°41′36.5″S 69°01′12.9″E

Geography
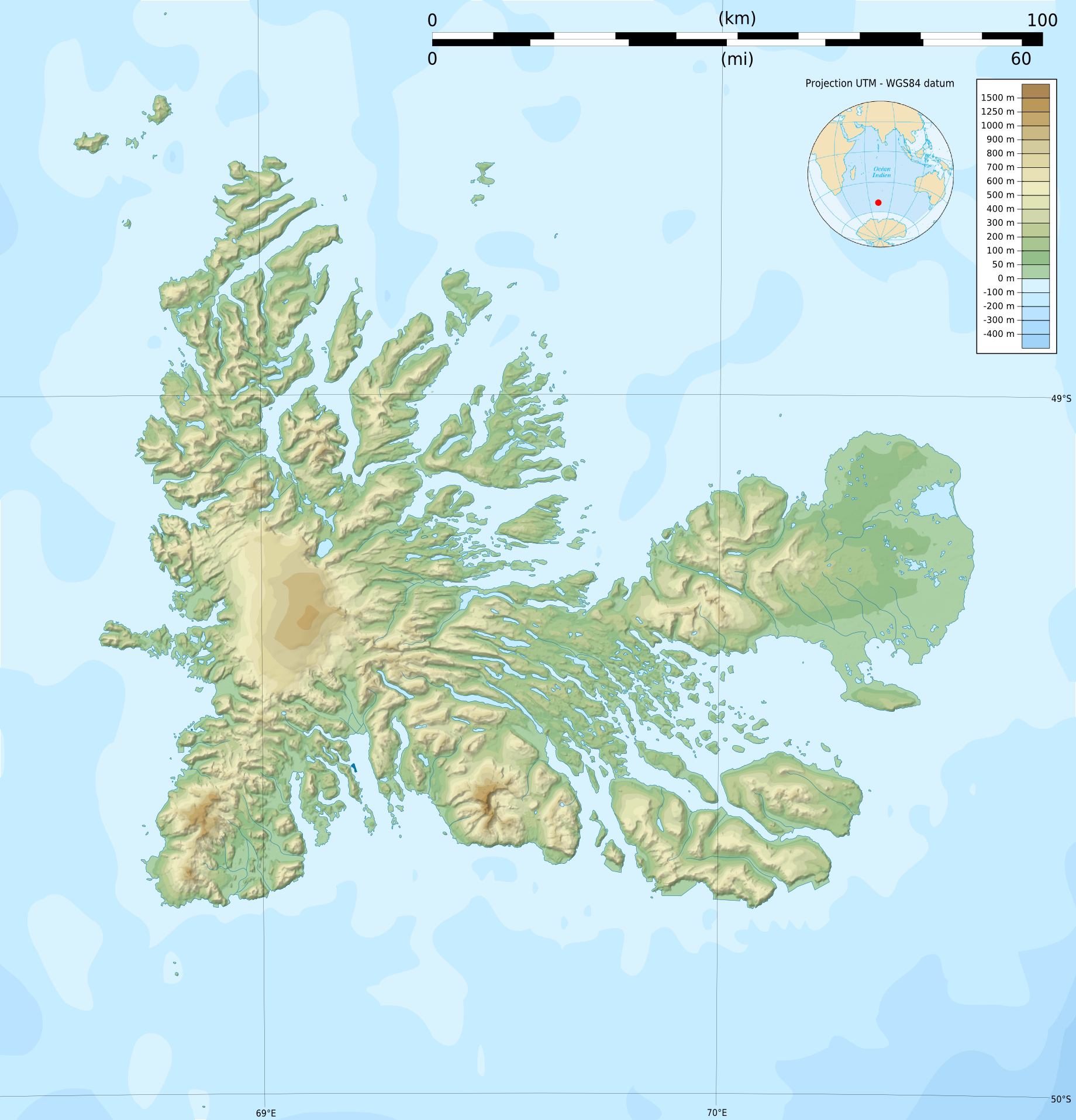
- Location within Kerguelen
- Location: Grande Terre, Kerguelen Islands, French Southern and Antarctic Lands

Geology
- Rock type: Basalt

Climbing
- First ascent: Unknown

Mont Havergal is a mountain in the French Southern and Antarctic Lands. Located in the Loranchet Peninsula at the northern end of Kerguelen, between Baie de l'Oiseau and Baie de la Dauphine, it rises to a height of 553 metres (1,814 ft) above sea level. To the north lies Baie Ducheyron, the northernmost bay of Kerguelen.

== History ==
This mountain was named in 1874 during the Challenger expedition after Arthur Havergal, second lieutenant of navigation on the HMS Challenger.

Mont Havergal was explored ten years later during the Ross expedition by Robert McCormick. He found fossilized tree trunks on its slopes and concluded that Kerguelen had been covered by forests in a previous era.

== See also ==
- Kerguelen Arch
- Port-Christmas
