= Baie de la Dauphine =

Natural harbour on the Loranchet Peninsula, Kerguelen Islands

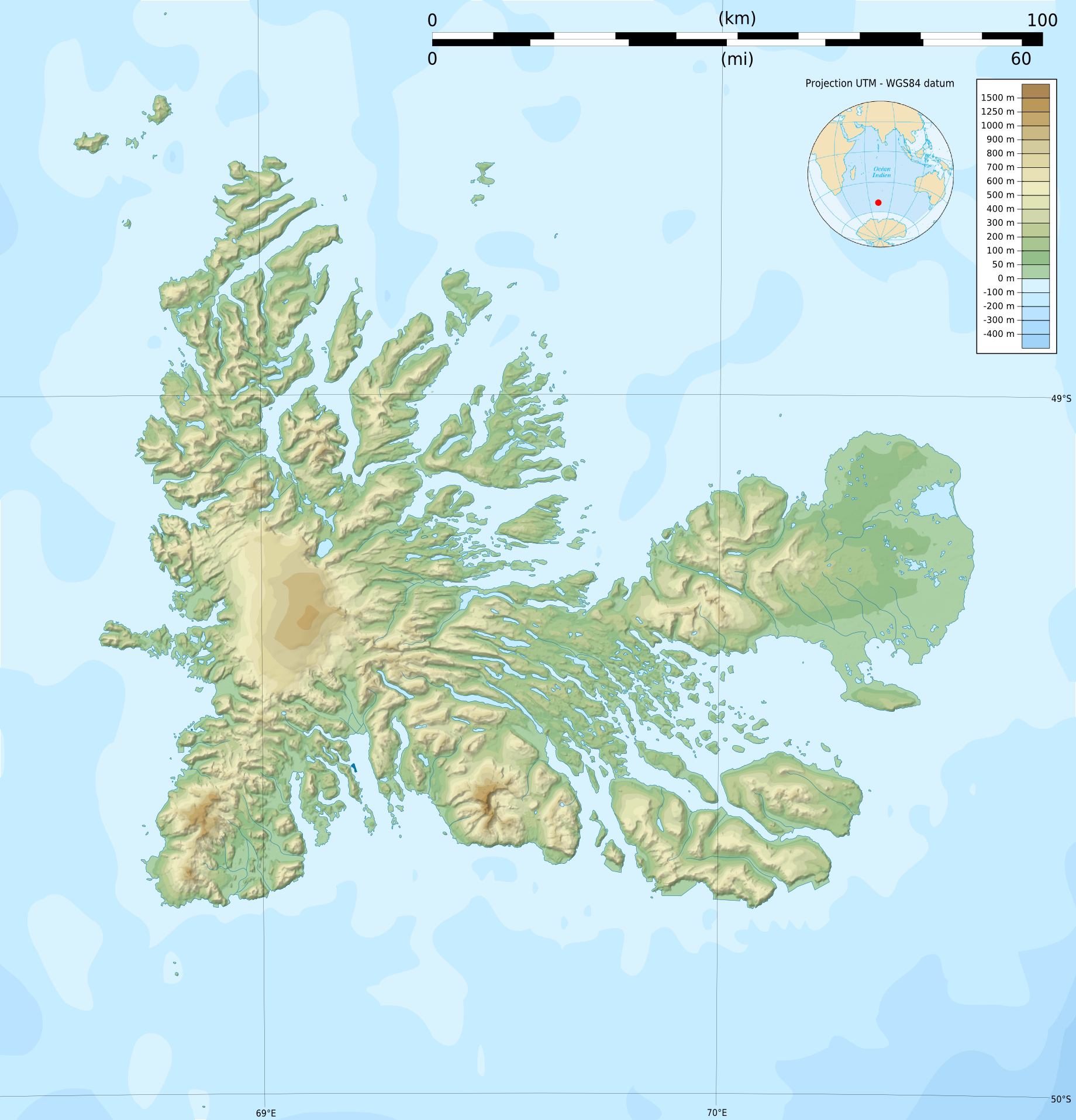
- Location in Kerguelen
- Location: French Southern and Antarctic Lands
- Coordinates: 48.716°S 69.036°E
- Ocean/sea sources: Indian Ocean
- Max. length: 8.4 km (5.2 mi)
- Max. width: 1.7 km (1.1 mi)

Baie de la Dauphine (French pronunciation: [bɛ də la dofin], Dauphine Bay) is a natural harbour located on the Loranchet Peninsula, at the north-west of Grande Terre in the Kerguelen Islands.

== Geography ==
The bay is located North of the Kerguelen, and opens towards the East, between the cape of the Kergelen Arch which limits its Northern extension and distinguishes it from Baie de l'Oiseau, and Discovery Presque-isle. It is 8.4 km (5.2 mi) long and 1.7 km (1.1 mi) wide at its maximum extension. The 552-metre (1,811 ft) Mont Havergal dominates the site on the North.

== Discovery ==
Lieutenant Kerguelen sighted the site during his first voyage in February 1772, without landing. In his second voyage, he arrived at the island in December 1773, and entered Baie de l'Oiseau in January 1774. Surveying the site, he named Baie de la Dauphine in honour of the corvette Dauphine, which was part of the expedition, under Ferron du Quengo. The site has also been called "Bay of the Portal", in reference to the Kerguelen Arch, on some older military maps.
