= Les Deux Frères =

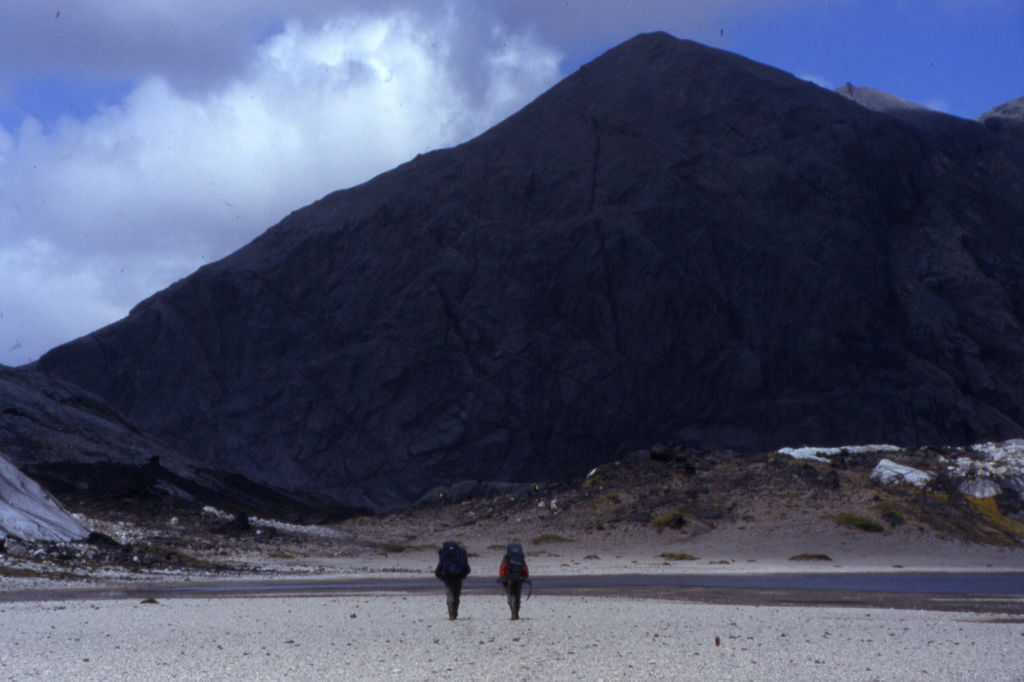

Highest point
- Elevation: 608 m (1,995 ft)
- Prominence: 501 m (1,644 ft)
- Coordinates: 49°37′38″S 68°59′56″E

Geography
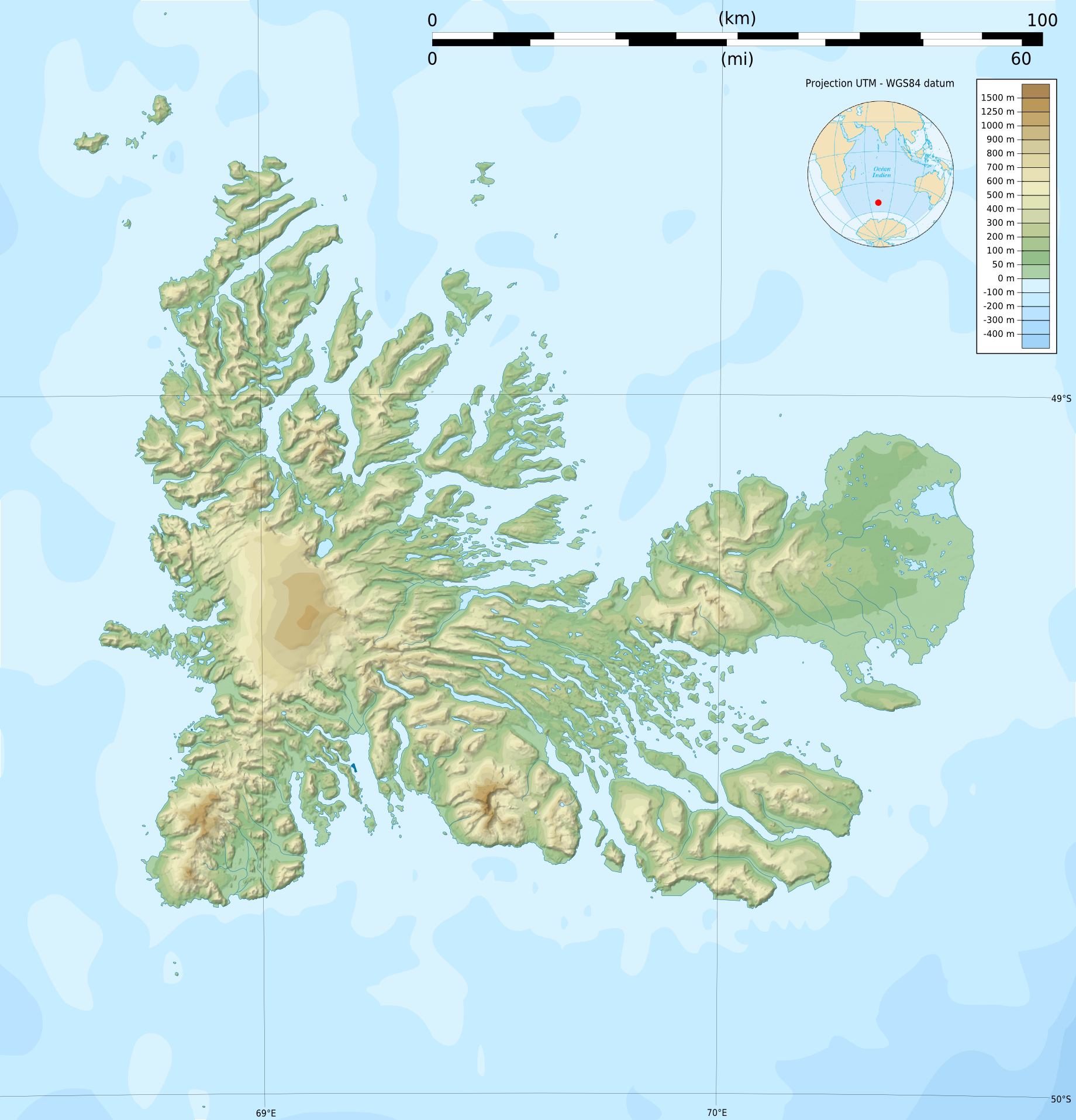
- Location within Kerguelen
- Location: Grande Terre, Kerguelen Islands, French Southern and Antarctic Lands

Climbing
- First ascent: Unknown

Les Deux Frères (French pronunciation: [le dø fʁɛʁ], lit. 'The Two Brothers') is a mountain in the French Southern and Antarctic Lands. Located in the Rallier du Baty Peninsula, near the southwestern shore of Kerguelen, it rises to a height of 608 metres (1,995 ft) above sea level.

This mountain is a small granite massif with two summits, hence its name. It was first named by the IGN team of geographers in mid 20th century.

== See also ==
- Toponymy of the Kerguelen Islands
