= Kerguelen Arch =

Former natural arch in the Kerguelen Islands

Coordinates: 48.6913°S 69.0717°E

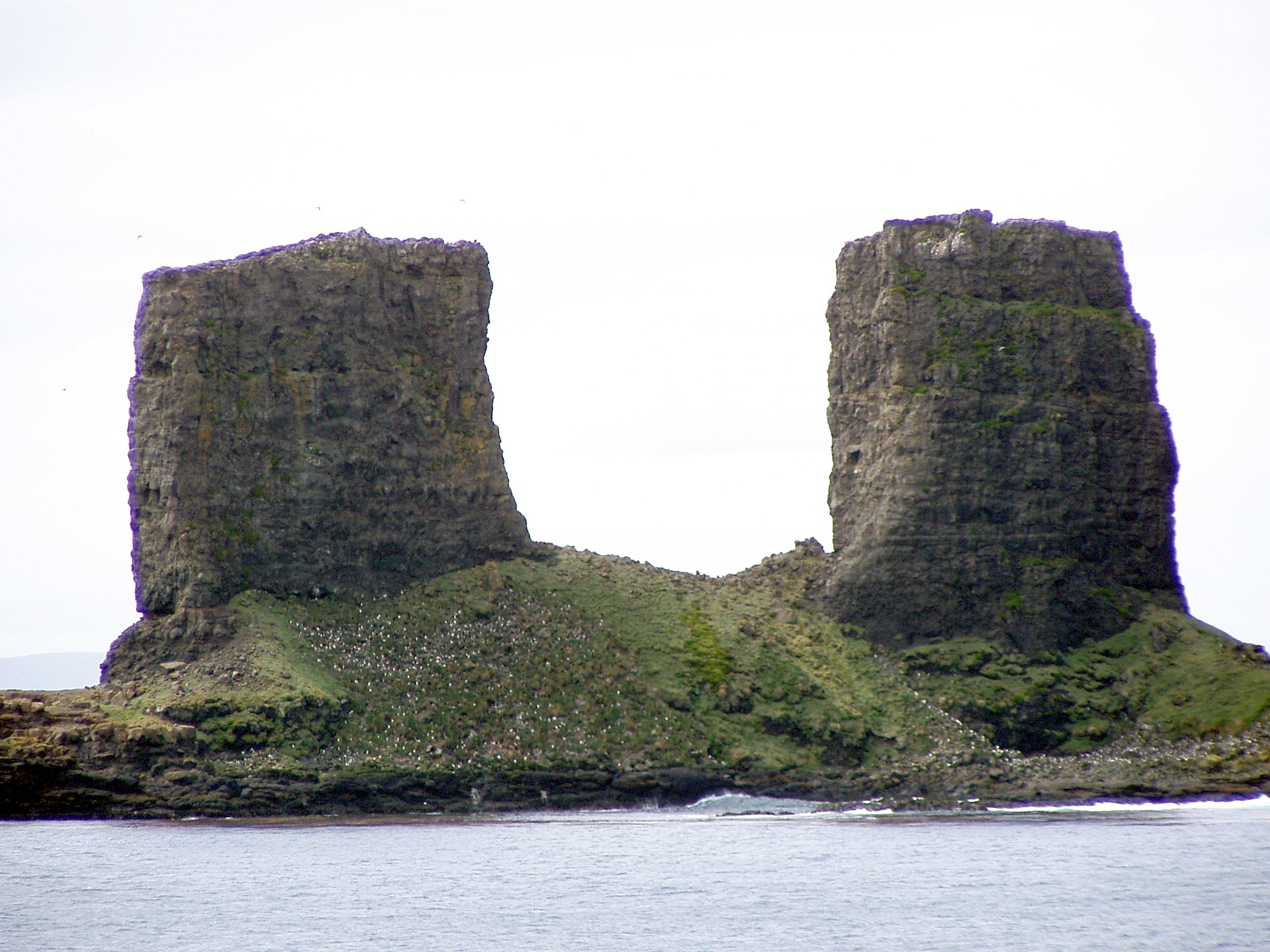
Twin pillars of the collapsed Kerguelen Arch, 2008.

The Kerguelen Arch is a former natural arch on the island of Grande Terre in the Kerguelen Islands of the French Southern and Antarctic Lands, an archipelago in the southern Indian Ocean. Although the arch collapsed sometime between 1908 and 1913, the remaining pillars can be found on the littoral zone of the cape between Baie de l'Oiseau and Baie de la Dauphine, north of the Loranchet Peninsula. It is one of the best-known structures of the area, and its twin pillars are depicted on numerous postage stamps of the TAAF.

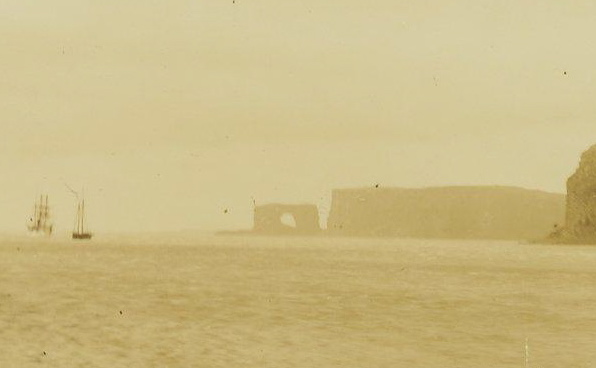
Baie de l'Oiseau and the Kerguelen Arch (centre) during the ceremonies held on the aviso Eure (left) on 2 January 1893.

== In literature ==
Jean-Paul Kauffmann wrote a book about the search for the Kerguelen Arch and Port-Christmas after he returned from a three-year captivity during the Lebanon hostage crisis.

The sixth volume of the comic Prométhée, by Christophe Bec and Stefano Raffaele, published in June 2012, depicts a Kerguelen Arch mysteriously found still standing in 2019, over a century after its collapse.
