= Alexandre de Lur Saluces =

French viticulturist (1934–2023)

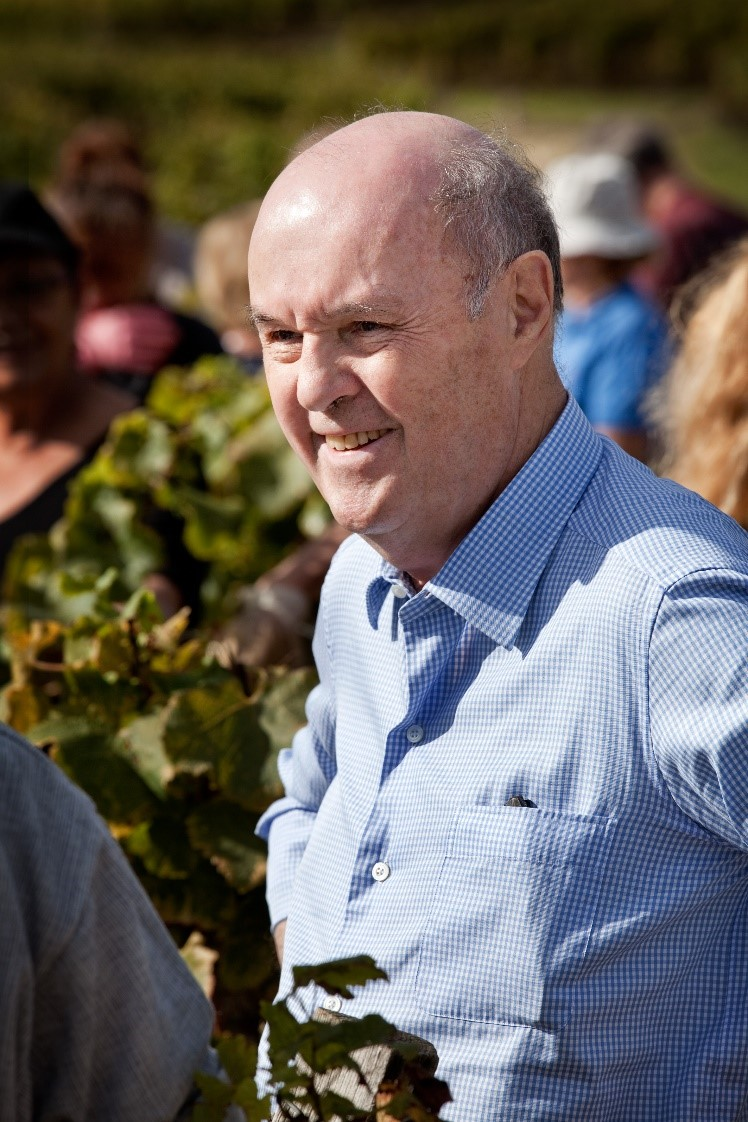
- Born: 20 May 1934; Vendenesse-lès-Charolles, France
- Died: 24 July 2023 (aged 89)
- Occupations: Viticulturist; Businessman; Politician
- Known for: Château d'Yquem

Count Alexandre de Lur Saluces (20 May 1934 – 24 July 2023) was a French viticulturist who for 36 years acted as manager of Château d’Yquem, and at the time of his death still acted in this capacity for Château de Fargues, both Sauternais châteaux held by the Lur Saluces family for generations.

== Biography ==
=== Early life ===
A member of the Lur Saluces, a noble family originally from Aquitaine. Born the eighth of nine siblings, he was the son of Amédée de Lur Saluces, and of Eléonore de Chabannes la Palice, niece of Bertrand de Lur Saluces and the daughter of Eugène de Lur-Saluces.

De Lur Saluces attended the Saint-Martin de France college in Pontoise. Then, he studied at the EDHEC Business School faculty of Law.

After his military service from 1959 to 1962, and experience working at a variety of companies, his uncle Bertrand marquis de Lur Saluces, taught him the family business of winemaking. Upon Bertrand's death on 19 December 1968, Alexandre took over management of d'Yquem until its takeover by LVMH in 1999.

Alexandre de Lur Saluces died on 24 July 2023, at the age of 89.

== Titles and distinctions ==
- Knight of the National Order of Agricultural Merit
- Knight of Merit of the Italian Republic

== Bibliography ==
- Léo Drouyn, La Guyenne militaire, 2 vol, Bordeaux, 1865, Laffitte reprints, Marseille, 1977, p. 329-337.
- Marguerite Figeac-Monthus, Uza, les Lur Saluces et la mise en valeur des Landes aux XVIII^{e} et XIX^{e} siècles, dans Château et innovation, Actes des Rencontres d’archéologie et d’histoire en Périgord, September 1999, textes réunis par Anne-Marie Cocula et Anne-Marie Dom, Ausonius-CAHMC, Bordeaux, 2000, p. 87–102.
- Idem, Les Lur Saluces d'Yquem, de la fin du XVIII^{e} siècle au milieu du XIX^{e} siècle, Mollat, Fédération Historique du Sud-Ouest, 2000.
- Mathilde Hulot, Alexandre de Lur Saluces. Le comte en sa demeure, in "Visages de vignerons", Figures du vin, Paris, Fleurus, 2005, p. 82-85.
- Périco Légasse, Alexandre de Lur Saluces, Le Prince de Fargues, in Marianne, October 2015.
- Alexandre de Lur Saluces, La morale d'Yquem, Entretiens avec Jean-Paul Kauffmann, Bordeaux, Mollat, 1999.
- Alexandre de Lur Saluces, Marguerite Figeac-Monthus, De l'Italie vers la France, de la province vers Paris, de la Guyenne vers le Cantal : Faire revivre les Lur Saluces d'Yquem aux XVIII^{e} et XIX^{e} siècles, in "Archives familiales et noblesse provinciale, La pierre et l'écrit", Grenoble, Presses Universitaires de Grenoble, 2006, p. 197-206.
- Richard Olney, Yquem, Paris, Flammarion, 1985.
- Nicolas de Rabaudy, Le comte de Lur Saluces s’insurge, in "Paris Match", No. 3407, 7 September 2007.
