= Jean-Paul Kauffmann =

French journalist and writer (born 1944)

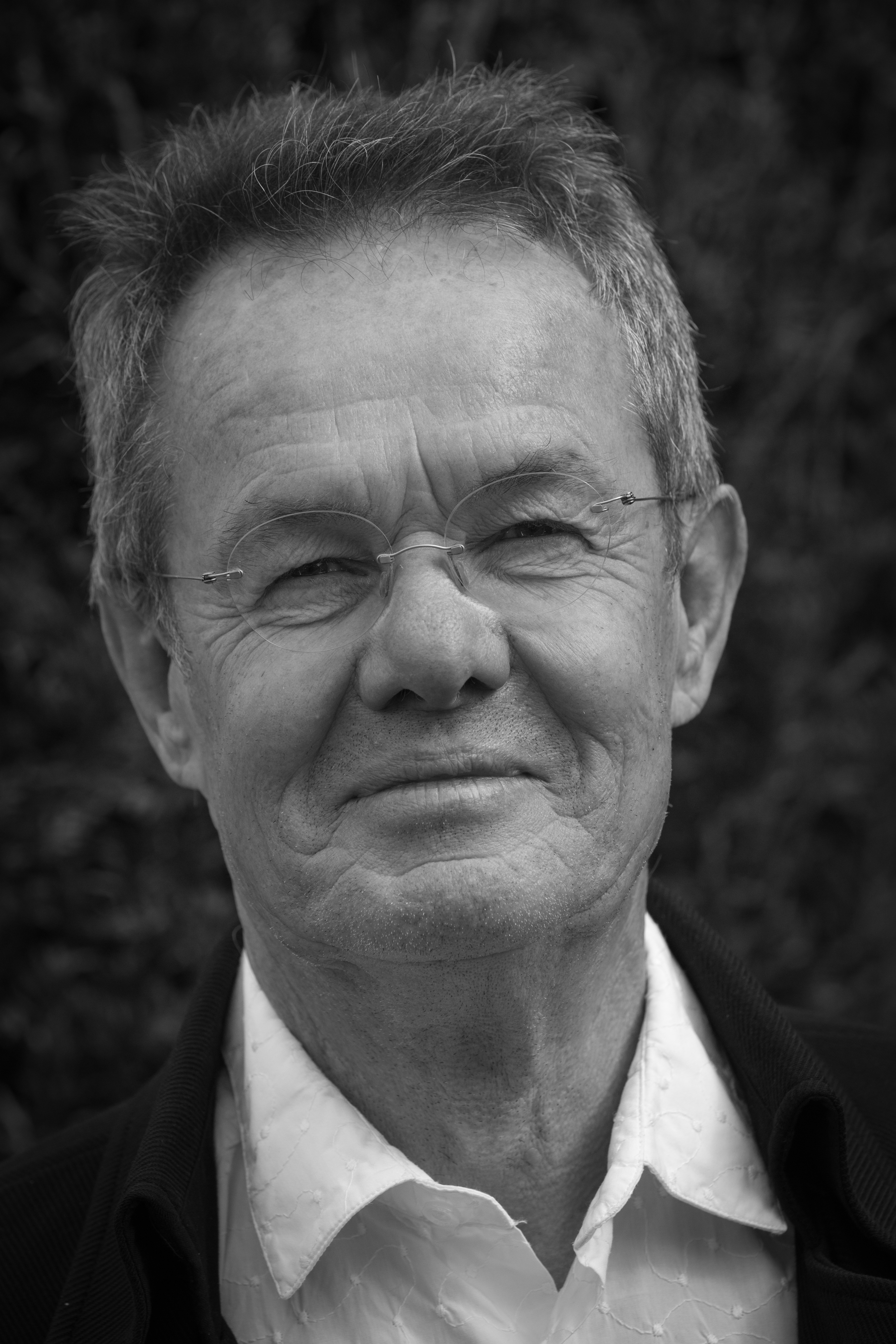
Jean-Paul Kauffmann in October 2013.

Jean-Paul Kauffmann (born 8 August 1944) is a French journalist and writer.

== Biography ==
His great-grandfather Michel Kauffmann left Alsace in 1871 after the Treaty of Frankfurt and settled in the region of Vitré. Jean-Paul Kauffmann was born at Saint-Pierre-la-Cour, but when he was nine months old, his parents moved to Corps-Nuds, in Ille-et-Vilaine, to take over a bakery. He entered as a boarder in a religious college at age 11. Unhappy during these "overwhelming years", he took refuge in reading the works of Balzac, Stendhal and above all, Jean de La Fontaine. Due to his love of literature, he believed he had the vocation of a journalist and studied at the École supérieure de journalisme de Lille between 1962 and 1966. He did his military service as a cooperant in an educational service in Quebec. He extended his stay there by working in a weekly supplement in the Montreal press. Assistant to the Quiet Revolution, he dreamed of staying permanently in the country after falling in love with Mara, a bookseller from Latvia, as he recalls in his narrative Courlande.

== Hostage in Lebanon ==
After returning to France in 1970, Kauffmann was employed as a journalist for Radio France Internationale for seven years before moving to AFP. In 1977, he joined the editorial office of the daily Le Matin de Paris and in 1984 became a reporter for L'Événement du jeudi. On 22 May 1985, while on assignment in Lebanon, he was abducted in Beirut along with sociologist Michel Seurat. His wife Joëlle Kauffmann was actively committed to his release which occurred on 4 May 1988 with other hostages, through the intervention of Jean-Charles Marchiani, while Jacques Chirac was Prime minister of François Mitterrand. Michel Seurat, who had been captured with Kauffmann, died in custody in 1986. On the occasion of this abduction, Jean-Paul Kauffman lived the traumatic experience of traveling on several occasions, wrapped in an Oriental carpet where asphyxia caused him to lose consciousness, which led him to deepen his reflection and strongly marked his life:

I do not know the historicity of this prophet Jesus Christ who raised the crowds for some time, but he still spoke words about love or wealth that I find unsurpassable. His message is even more topical than ever. This resonates very strongly within me. Not only, he said, you must forgive your enemies, but you must also love them.

His captors provided him with some books during his captivity, including the second volume of Leo Tolstoy's War and Peace and John le Carré's The Spy Who Came in from the Cold. In the latter, Kauffmann found many similarities and an understanding of his captors’ behavior.

== Writer ==
In 1994, Jean-Paul Kauffmann created the magazine L'Amateur de cigare.

As a writer, he published L'Kerguelen Arch (1993) which earned the Prix Jean-Freustié, then La Chambre noire de Longwood : le voyage à Sainte-Hélène (1997) which was awarded numerous prizes (prix Roger Nimier, Grand Prix Lire-RTL, Prix Jules-Verne, prix Joseph-Kessel and Prix Livre et Mer); La Lutte avec l'Ange (2001) and 31, allées Damour - Raymond Guérin 1905-1955 (2004). All these books have a common theme: enclosure, but never directly evoke his experience as a hostage.

In 2002, Jean-Paul Kauffmann received the Grand prix de littérature Paul-Morand awarded by the Académie française.

For the first time in 2007, in La Maison du retour (2007), he evokes his captivity, his situation as a hostage and the moments which followed his return; the painful relearning of a "normal" life; his inability to read, for him the great literature enthusiast. As in all Jean-Paul Kauffmann's books, everything is written, in a subdued tone: through the story of buying a house, a den or an airlock, so as to be able to return to his family and to life.

A lover of Bordeaux wines, he has published several books on the subject.

With Courlande (Fayard, 2009), the story of a journey sets the plot of several quests, including that of the identity of a country, Courland.

He was awarded the Prix de la langue française in 2009 for all his work.

== Publications ==
- 1989: Voyage à Bordeaux, photographs by Michel Guillard, Caisse des dépôts et consignations
- 1989: Le Bordeaux retrouvé (excluding trade)
- 1992: L'Arche des Kerguelen : voyages aux îles de la désolation, Flammarion, prix Jean-Freustié
- 1997: La Chambre noire de Longwood : le voyage à Sainte-Hélène, La Table Ronde, prix Roger Nimier, prix Joseph Kessel, ISBN 2-7103-0772-3.
  - 1999: The Dark Room at Longwood: A Voyage to St. Helena, ISBN 978-1-860-46602-1.
- 1997: Preface to Brouillard d'automne, by Frédéric H. Fajardie, La Table Ronde
- 1997: L'Œil originel, photographs by Frédéric Desmesure, published on the occasion of the 9th Salon Vinexpo and the exhibition "Regards du monde", Bordeaux, Parc des expositions, 16–20 June 1997, Mollat
- 1997: Postface to Mes grands Bordeaux, by Pierre-Jean Rémy, Albin Michel
- 1999: La Morale d'Yquem : conversations with Alexandre de Lur Saluces, Mollat-Grasset
- 2001: La Lutte avec l'Ange, La Table Ronde, ISBN 2-7103-2389-3
- 2003: Preface to L'Âme du vin (1932), by Maurice Constantin-Weyer, La Table Ronde
- 2004: 31, allées Damour : Raymond Guérin, 1905-1955, Berg International-La Table Ronde
- 2005: Preface to Retour de barbarie, by Raymond Guérin, Éditions Finitude.
- 2007: La Maison du retour, NiL Éditions, Prix Bretagne 2007
- 2007: Preface to 5 rue des Italiens. Chroniques du Monde, by Bernard Frank, Grasset
- 2009: Courlande, Fayard, ISBN 9782213629926.
  - 2012: A Journey to Nowhere: Among the Lands and History of Courland, MacLehose Press, ISBN 978-0-857-05036-6.
- 2010: Preface to Château La Louvière. Le bel art du vin, by Hélène Brun-Puginier, La Martinière
- 2011: Voyage à Bordeaux 1989, edition revised and corrected by the author, Éditions des Équateurs, "Parallèles"
- 2011: Voyage en Champagne 1990, edition revised and corrected by the author, Éditions des Équateurs, "Parallèles"
- 2013: Remonter la Marne, Fayard
- 2016: Outre-Terre, Éditions des Équateurs
- 2019: Venise à double tour, Éditions des Équateurs
- 2023: Zones limites, Éditions Bouquins
- 2025: L’accident, Paris, Éditions des Équateurs
