= French ship Eure (1886) =

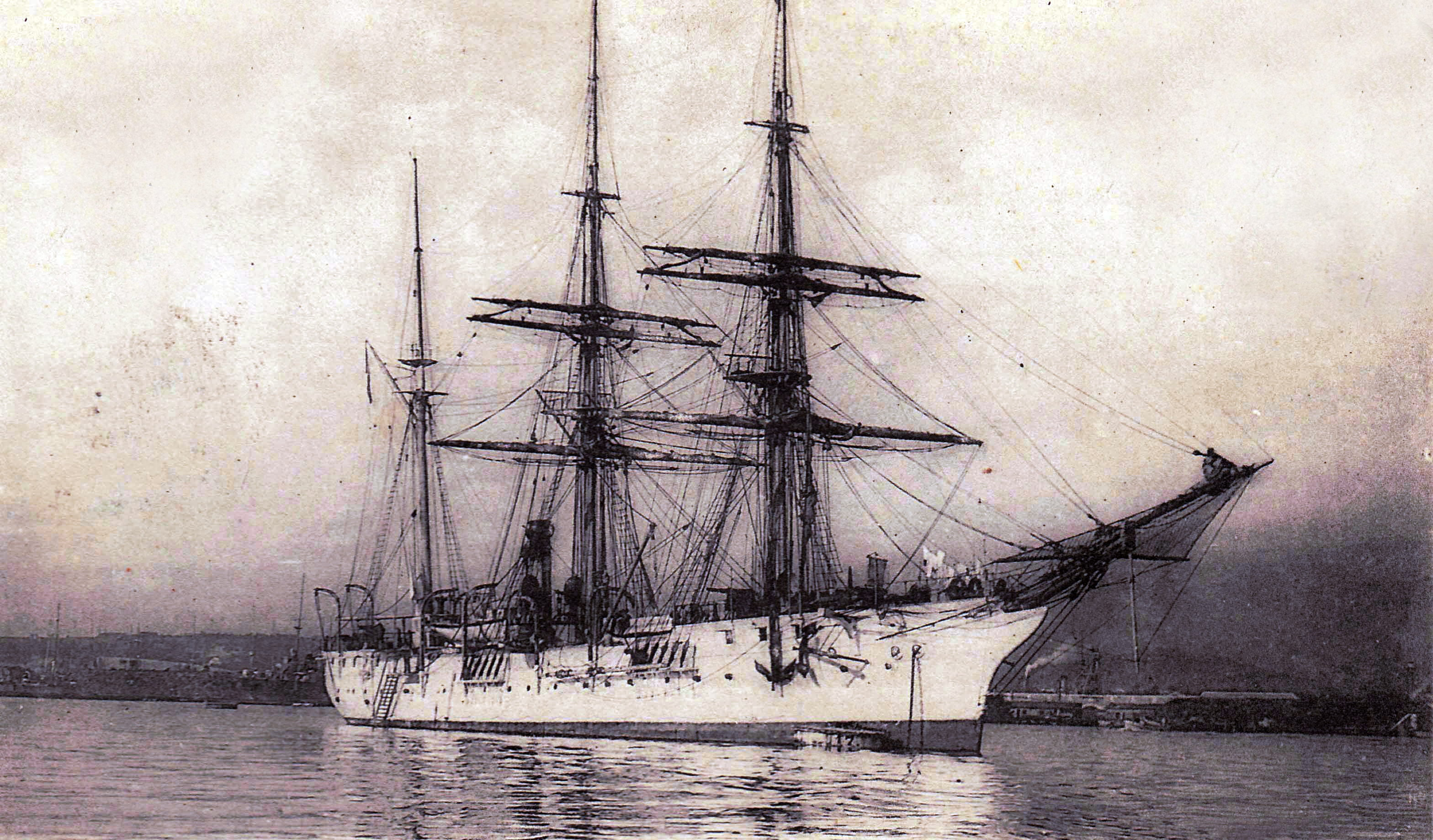
- Vaucluse, sister-ship of Eure

History

France
- Name: Eure
- Namesake: Eure river
- Laid down: 11 March 1884
- Launched: 5 April 1886
- Out of service: 8 August 1901

General characteristics
- Class & type: Meurthe-class aviso
- Tons burthen: 1600 tonnes
- Length: 64 metres
- Beam: 10.5 metres
- Draught: 4.9 metres
- Propulsion: 650 shp steam engine
- Sail plan: Full-rigged ship
- Speed: 12 knots
- Complement: 107 men
- Armament: 6 × 140 mm guns; 2 × 90 mm guns; 4 × 37 mm Hotchkiss guns

Eure was a Meurthe-class aviso of the French Navy. She was launched in 1886. She is notable as having claimed territories of the Southern Indian Ocean for France, including the Kerguelen Islands in 1893. She continued to serve in the Pacific until 1901.

== Career ==
Construction of Eure began in 1886 at the Ateliers et chantiers du Havre. She was part of a 1885 order comprising six other avisos of the same class (Meurthe, Drôme, Aube, Durance, Rance and Manche), designed as mixed sail and steam ships. Eure was launched on 5 April 1886, and commissioned on 14 August 1890 at Rochefort, where she was based.

President Sadi Carnot sent Eure on a mission to claim the French Southern and Antarctic Lands for France. On 1 January 1893, Eure entered Baie de l'Oiseau, North of Kerguelen Islands. Commander Lieutard, the commanding officer, held a ceremony at Port-Christmas the next day, where a copper plaque inscribed « EURE - 1893 » was set. He repeated this in various locations of the archipelago in the following 15 days. Eure continued her claims at île Saint-Paul on 22 January 1893, and at île Amsterdam on 24 January, before returning to Réunion and Madagascar.

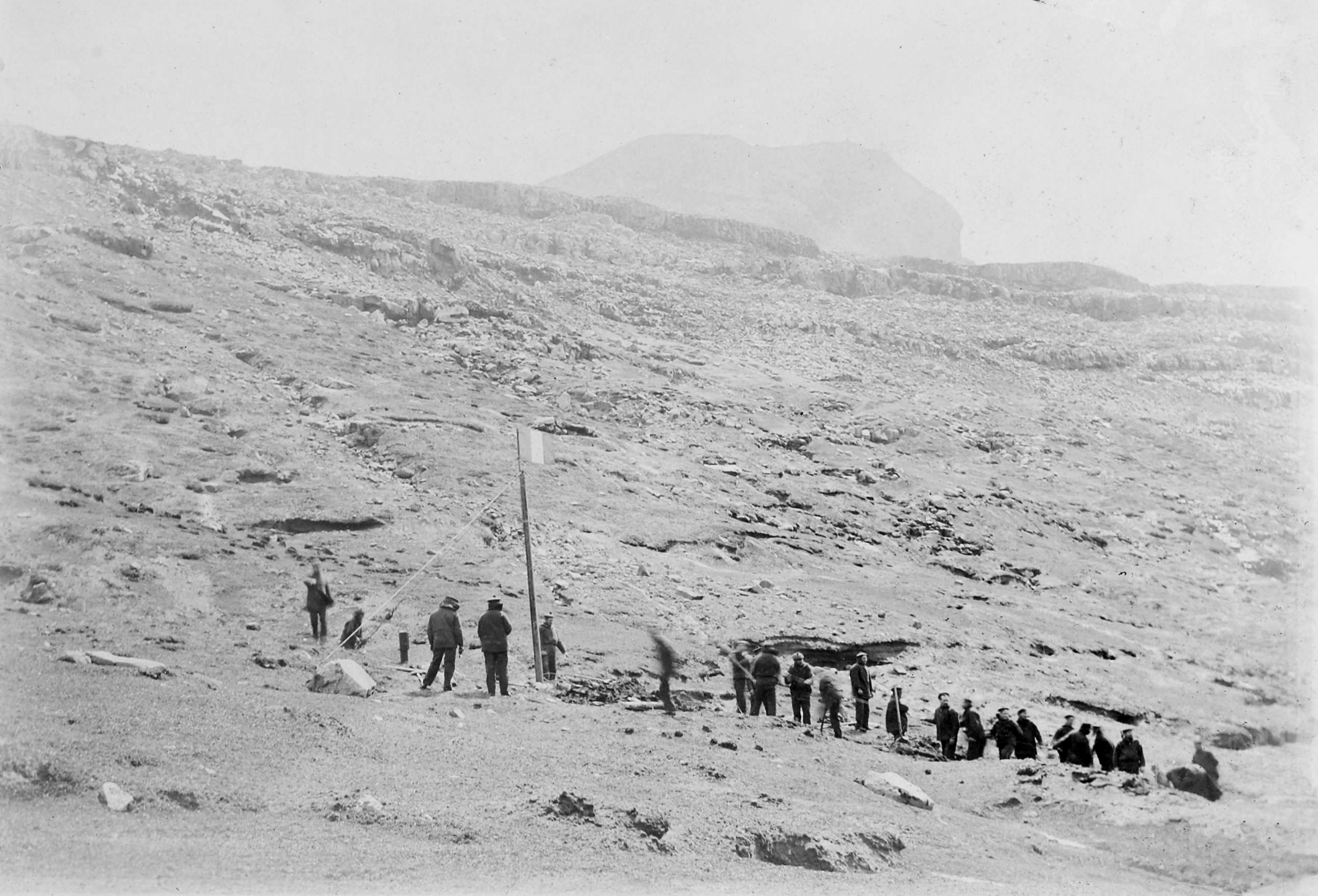
Port-Christmas on 2 January 1893

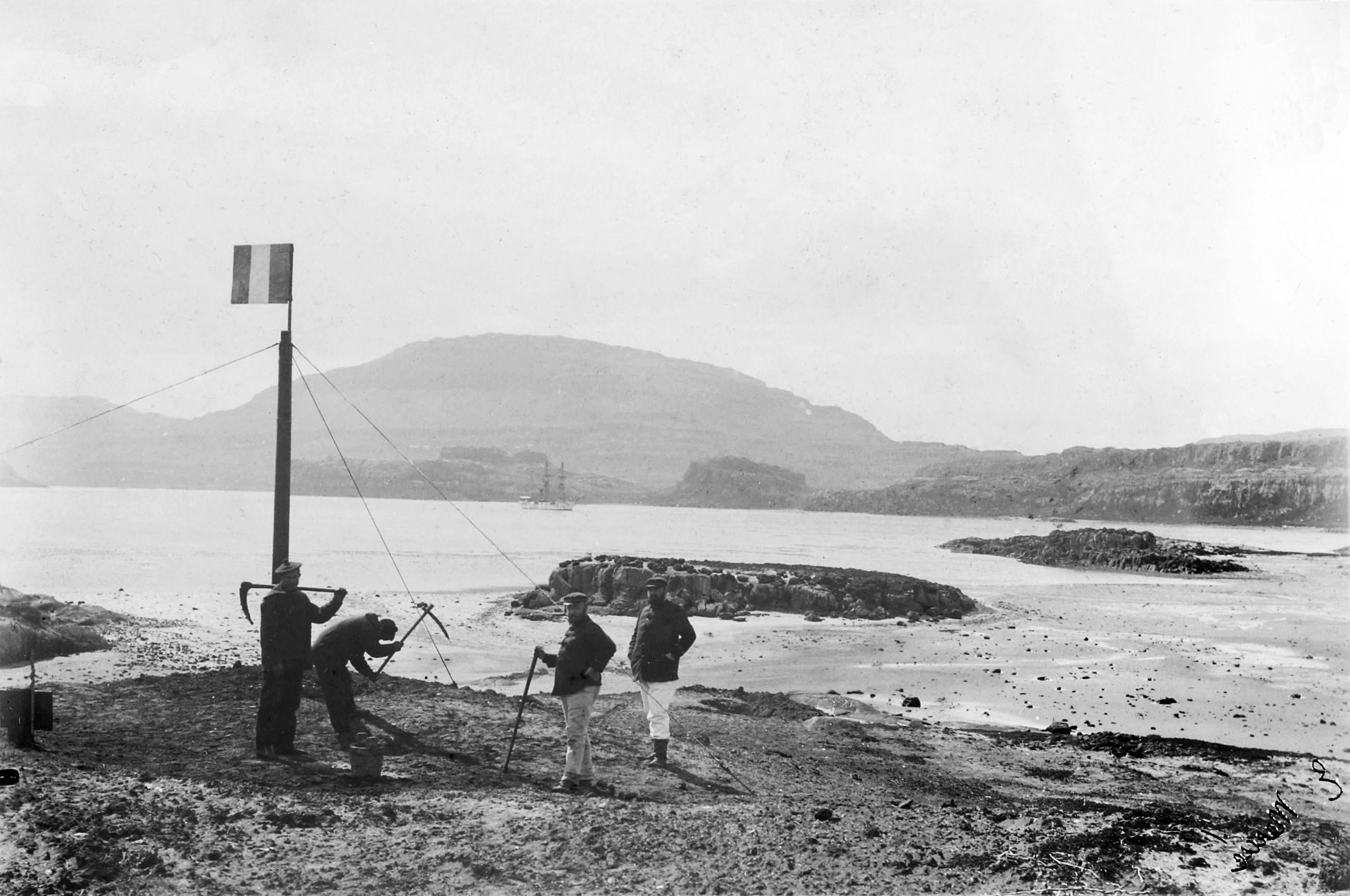
Port-Gazelle on 8 January 1893

In 1897, under Alphonse Lecuve, Eure toured New Guinea and Brisbane, finally arriving at Nouméa in New Caledonia. From then on, she was attached to the French Pacific Fleet.

Eure was decommissioned on 8 March 1901.

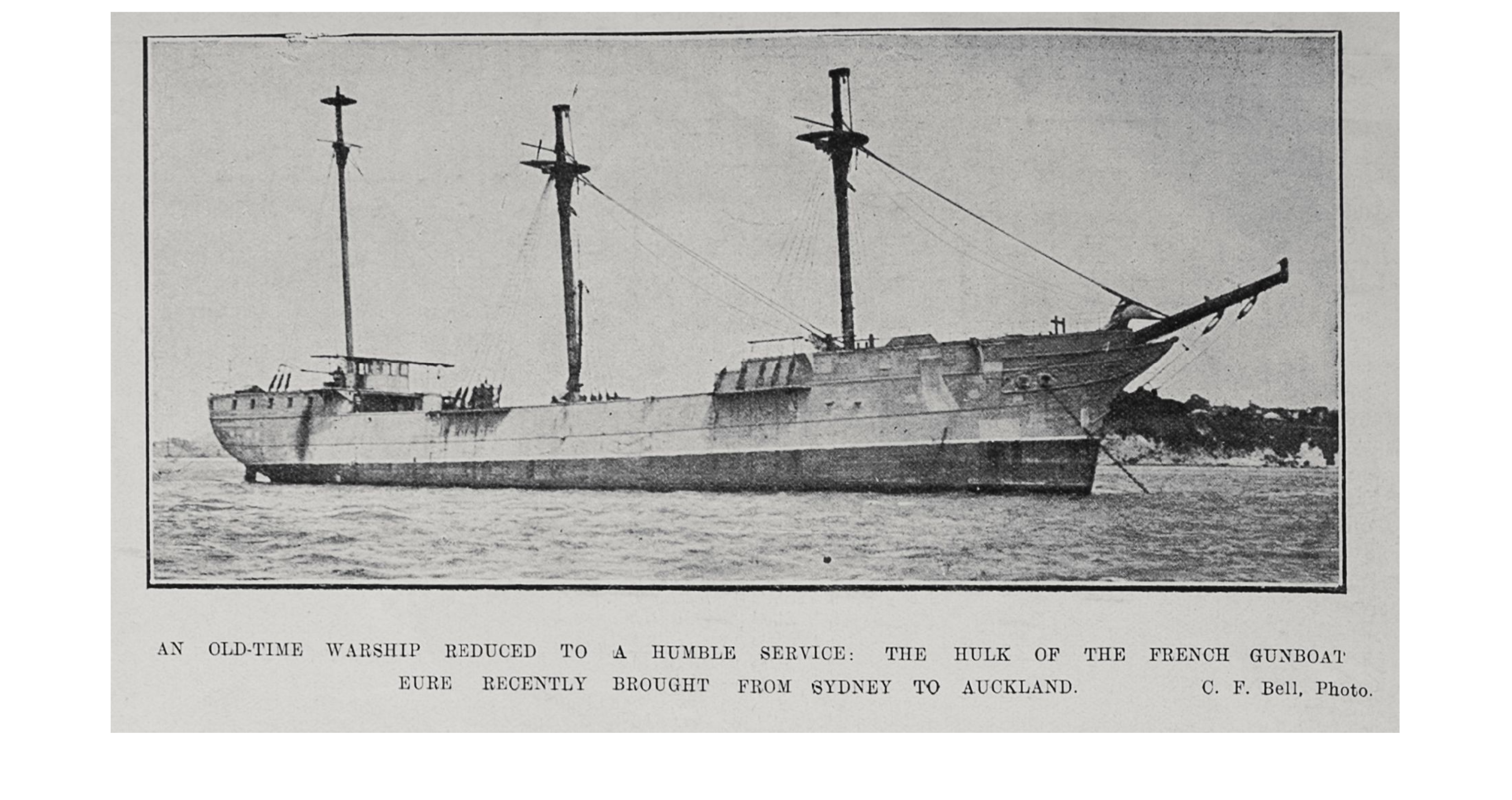
Eure in Auckland Harbour in 1913

== Use as a coal hulk ==
In 1911 Eure was stripped at Nouméa to become a hulk and sent to Sydney, where she was sold to the Northern Steamship Company in 1912. On 26 January 1913 she arrived at Auckland, towed by the steamer Ihumata. The hulk held up to 2,000 tons of coal. In 1939 she was towed to nearby Sulphur Beach and sold for breaking up, which was done by 1942. Masts from the ship still lay on the beach in the 1960s.
