= Henri de Paschal de Rochegude =

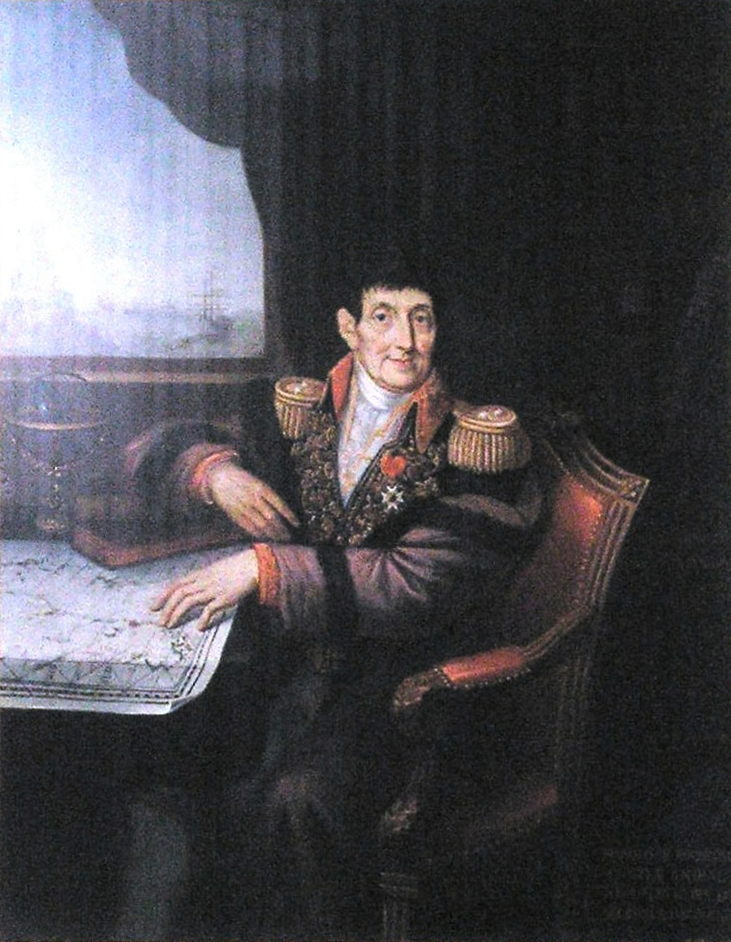
- Born: 8 December 1741; Albi, France
- Died: 16 March 1834 (aged 92) Albi, France
- Branch: French Navy
- Rank: captain
- Conflicts: Battle of Ushant; action of 17 August 1779; Battle of Cape Spartel

Henri de Paschal de Rochegude (Albi, 8 December 1741 — Albi, 16 March 1834) was a French Navy officer. He served in the War of American Independence, and became a member of the Académie de Marine.

== Biography ==
Rochegude joined the Navy as a Garde-Marine on 20 May 1757. He took part in the Second voyage of Kerguelen.

Rochegude was promoted to Lieutenant on 14 February 1778. That year, he served as first officer in the frigate Résolue, part of the squadron under Orvilliers. He took part in the Battle of Ushant on 27 July 1778 He later transferred to the frigate Junon, taking part in the capture of HMS Ardent in the action of 17 August 1779.

He later served on the 110-gun Royal Louis, taking part in the Battle of Cape Spartel on 20 October 1782.

Rochegude was promoted to Captain in May 1786. He then started a political career.

Rochegude retired in 1800, and from then on he researched Occitan poetry and even published about it.

== Sources and references ==
=== Bibliography ===
- Doneaud Du Plan, Alfred (1878). Histoire de l'Académie de marine (in French). Paris: Berger-Levrault.
- Lacour-Gayet, Georges (1905). La marine militaire de la France sous le règne de Louis XVI. Paris: Honoré Champion. OCLC 763372623.

=== Source ===
- Rochegude, Henri Pascal de (1819). Le Parnasse Occitanien ou choix de Poësies Originales des Troubadours, tirées des manuscrits nationaux [The Occitan Parnassus or selection of original Troubadours verses taken from national manuscripts]. Toulouse: Benichet Cadet.
