= Louis Édouard Paul Lieutard =

Louis Édouard Paul Lieutard (Brignoles, 21 June 1842 — 23 October 1902) was a French Navy officer. He notably set a formal claim for France on the Kerguelen Islands in 1893. Mont Lieutard was named in his honour.

== Biography ==
Lieutard joined the Navy in 1859. He was promoted to Midshipman at Toulon in 1861, to Ensign in 1865, and to Lieutenant in 1865.

He served on the aviso Vaudreuil, the armoured frigate Gauloise, and the armoured frigate Provence.

In 1884, he was given command of the schooner Aorai at Tahiti, and was promoted to Commander the year after. After working ashore at Toulon for several years, he was given command of the gunboat Fusée in 1891.

In 1892, Lieutard was given command of Eure. From 1 to 15 January 1893, he conducted a mission to formally claim possession of the Kerguelen Islands for France. The crew of Eure set copper plaques and emergency food depots for castaways in various sports of the islands.

Lieutard went on to captain the paddle aviso Shamrock, and served as director or port moves in Toulon and Brest.

== Works ==
- Lieutard, Louis Édourd Paul (1893). "Mission aux îles de Kerguelen, Saint-Paul et Amsterdam". Annales Hydrographiques. 15. Paris: Imprimerie Nationale. OCLC 41816068.

== Sources and references ==
Notes

External links

- Rouxel, Jean-Christophe. "Louis Edouard Paul LIEUTARD".
- "Lieutard's file for Officer in the Legion of Honour". LEONORE.
