= Loranchet Peninsula =

Coordinates: 48°42′S 69°00′E

Topographic map of the Kerguelen archipelago showing the peninsula in the north-west (upper left)

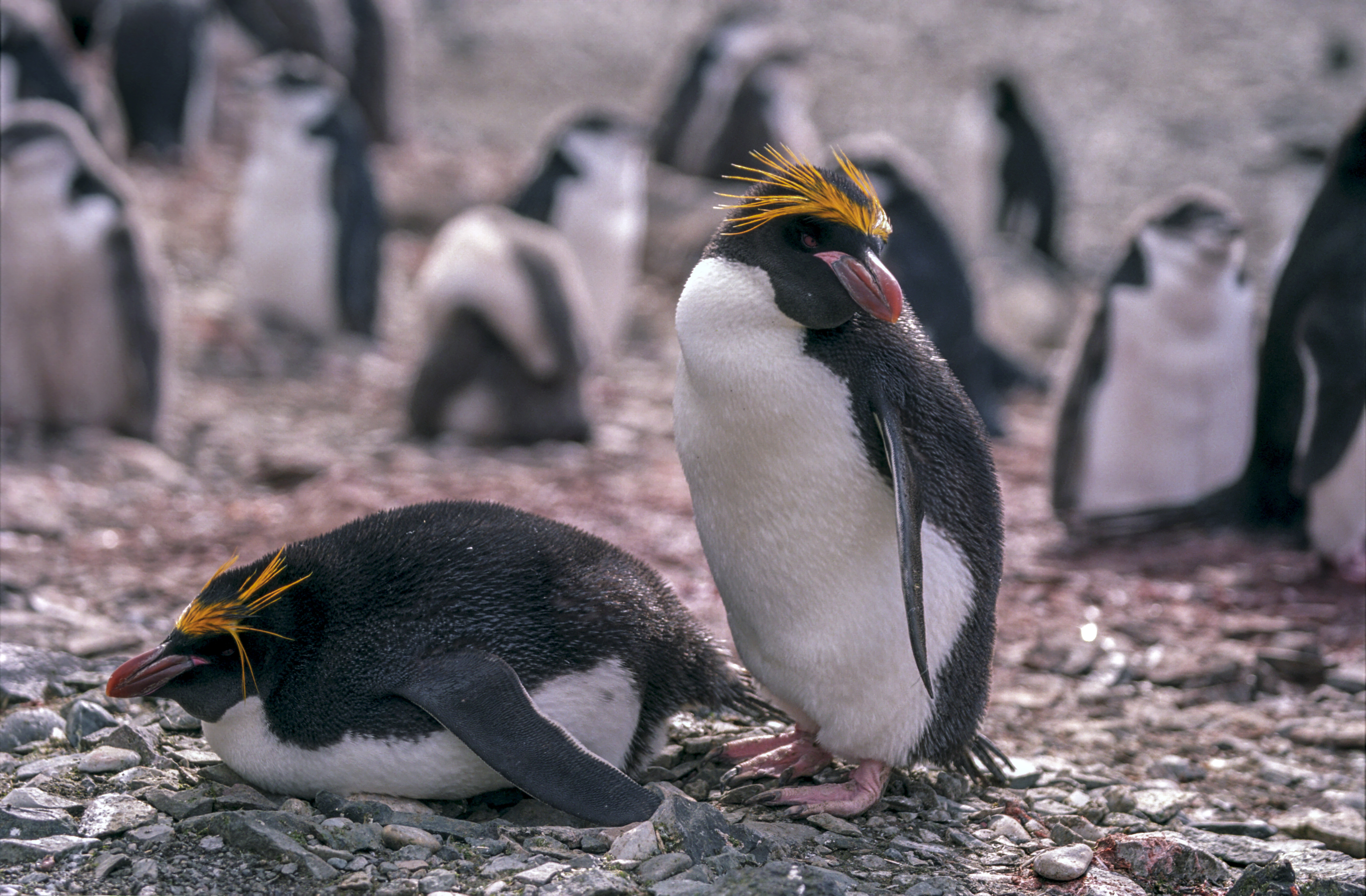
The northern tip of the peninsula is an important breeding site for macaroni penguins

The Péninsule Loranchet, also known as Presqu'île Loranchet, (Loranchet Peninsula in English) is a peninsula of Grande Terre, the main island of the subantarctic Kerguelen archipelago in the southern Indian Ocean.

== Description ==
The peninsula occupies the north-western corner of Grande Terre and is named after Jean Loranchet, the first officer of Raymond Rallier du Baty’s second Kerguelen survey expedition in 1913. It has a rugged, mountainous interior, with altitudes exceeding 500 m and a coastline of steep cliffs deeply incised by fjords. It is some 50 km long with a width of up to 20 km. As with most of Grande Terre, it is infested with introduced feral cats, rats and rabbits. Human visitation is infrequent.

== Important Bird Area ==
The northern end of the peninsula, and the northernmost part of Grande Terre, extending northwards from the head of the Baie de la Dauphine, has been identified as a 60 km^{2} Important Bird Area (IBA) by BirdLife International because of its breeding seabirds. At least 23 bird species breed in the IBA. As well as a colony of 250,000 pairs of macaroni penguins at the tip of the peninsula, there are also 5,400 pairs of southern rockhopper penguins and a small colony of 400 pairs of black-browed albatrosses. Cape petrels and Kerguelen shags nest on the cliffs. Other birds include light-mantled albatrosses, Kerguelen terns and Eaton's pintails. Antarctic fur seals and southern elephant seals breed in the IBA.
