= Geography of the Solomon Islands =

Geography of Solomon Islands
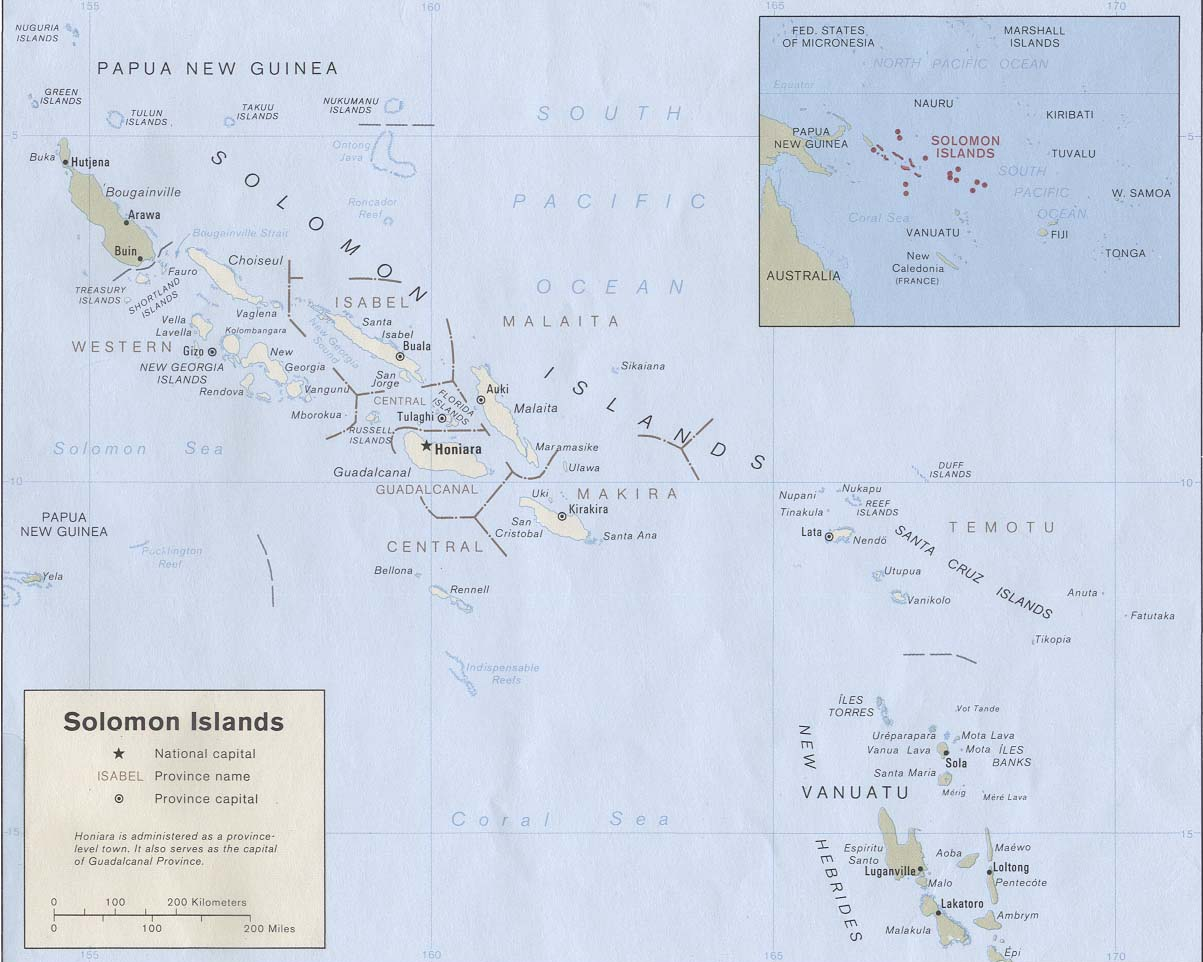
- Continent: Pacific Ocean
- Region: Oceania
- Coordinates: 8°00′S 159°00′E
- Area: Ranked 139th
  - Total: 29,000 km^{2} (11,000 sq mi)
  - Land: 96.8%
  - Water: 3.2%
- Coastline: 5,313 km (3,301 mi)
- Borders: None
- Highest point: Mount Popomanaseu; 2,332 metres (7,651 ft)
- Lowest point: Pacific Ocean; 0 m
- Exclusive economic zone: 1,589,477 km^{2} (613,701 mi^{2})

Solomon Islands is an island country in the South Pacific Ocean, that lies east of Papua New Guinea.

== Islands ==
The major part of the nation of Solomon Islands is the mountainous volcanic islands of the Solomon Islands (archipelago), which includes Choiseul, the Shortland Islands, the New Georgia Islands, Santa Isabel, the Russell Islands, the Florida Islands, Tulagi, Malaita, Maramasike, Ulawa, Owaraha (Santa Ana), Makira (San Cristobal), and the main island of Guadalcanal. (The largest island in the archipelago is Bougainville, but it is politically an autonomous region of the neighbouring country of Papua New Guinea.) Solomon Islands also includes isolated low-lying atolls and volcanic islands such as Sikaiana, Rennell Island, Bellona Island, the Santa Cruz Islands and the remote, tiny outliers, Tikopia, Anuta, and Fatutaka.

The distance between the most western and most eastern islands is about 1,500 km (930 mi). Especially the Santa Cruz Islands, north of Vanuatu, are isolated at more than 200 km (120 mi) from the other islands. The total land size is 29,000 km^{2} (11,000 mi^{2}). It has the 22nd largest Exclusive Economic Zone of 1,589,477 km^{2} (613,701 mi^{2}).

== Geology and ecology ==
Share of forest area in total land area, top countries (2021). The Solomon Islands have the sixth highest percentage of forest cover in the world.

Volcanoes with varying degrees of activity are situated on some of the larger islands, while many of the smaller islands are simply tiny atolls covered in sand and palm trees.

The baseline survey of marine biodiversity in the Solomon Islands that was carried out in 2004, found 474 species of corals in the Solomons as well as nine species which could be new to science. This is the second highest diversity of corals in the World, second only to the Raja Ampat Islands in eastern Indonesia.

== Climate ==
The climate is tropical, though temperatures are rarely extreme due to cooling winds blowing off the surrounding seas. Daytime temperatures are normally 25 to 32 °C (77 to 90 °F). From April to October (the dry season), the southeast trade winds blow, gusting at times up to 30 knots (56 km/h) or more.

November to March is the wet season—the northwest monsoon—typically warmer and wetter. Cyclones arise in the Coral Sea and the area of the Solomon Islands, but they usually veer toward Vanuatu and New Caledonia or down the coast of Australia.

=== Climate data ===
Climate data for Honiara (Köppen Af)
Month	Jan	Feb	Mar	Apr	May	Jun	Jul	Aug	Sep	Oct	Nov	Dec	Year
Record high °C (°F)	33.9 (93.0)	36.1 (97.0)	33.9 (93.0)	33.4 (92.1)	33.6 (92.5)	32.8 (91.0)	33.3 (91.9)	33.5 (92.3)	33.4 (92.1)	33.3 (91.9)	33.4 (92.1)	34.8 (94.6)	34.8 (94.6)
Mean daily maximum °C (°F)	30.7 (87.3)	30.5 (86.9)	30.2 (86.4)	30.5 (86.9)	30.7 (87.3)	30.4 (86.7)	30.1 (86.2)	30.4 (86.7)	30.6 (87.1)	30.7 (87.3)	30.7 (87.3)	30.5 (86.9)	30.5 (86.9)
Daily mean °C (°F)	26.7 (80.1)	26.6 (79.9)	26.6 (79.9)	26.5 (79.7)	26.6 (79.9)	26.4 (79.5)	26.1 (79.0)	26.2 (79.2)	26.5 (79.7)	26.5 (79.7)	26.7 (80.1)	26.8 (80.2)	26.5 (79.7)
Mean daily minimum °C (°F)	23.0 (73.4)	23.0 (73.4)	23.0 (73.4)	22.9 (73.2)	22.8 (73.0)	22.5 (72.5)	22.2 (72.0)	22.1 (71.8)	22.3 (72.1)	22.5 (72.5)	22.7 (72.9)	23.0 (73.4)	22.7 (72.9)
Record low °C (°F)	20.2 (68.4)	20.7 (69.3)	20.7 (69.3)	20.1 (68.2)	20.5 (68.9)	19.4 (66.9)	18.7 (65.7)	18.8 (65.8)	18.3 (64.9)	17.6 (63.7)	17.8 (64.0)	20.5 (68.9)	17.6 (63.7)
Average precipitation mm (inches)	277 (10.9)	287 (11.3)	362 (14.3)	214 (8.4)	141 (5.6)	97 (3.8)	100 (3.9)	92 (3.6)	95 (3.7)	154 (6.1)	141 (5.6)	217 (8.5)	2,177 (85.7)
Average precipitation days (≥ 0.1 mm)	19	19	23	18	15	13	15	13	13	16	15	18	197
Average relative humidity (%)	80	81	81	80	80	79	75	73	73	75	76	77	78
Mean monthly sunshine hours	186.0	155.4	198.4	192.0	210.8	198.0	186.0	204.6	192.0	226.3	216.0	164.3	2,329.8
Mean daily sunshine hours	6.0	5.5	6.4	6.4	6.8	6.6	6.0	6.6	6.4	7.3	7.2	5.3	6.4
Source: Deutscher Wetterdienst

Climate data for Yandina (Köppen Af)
Month	Jan	Feb	Mar	Apr	May	Jun	Jul	Aug	Sep	Oct	Nov	Dec	Year
Mean daily maximum °C (°F)	31 (88)	31 (88)	31 (87)	31 (88)	31 (87)	30 (86)	30 (86)	31 (87)	30 (86)	30 (86)	31 (87)	31 (88)	31 (87)
Mean daily minimum °C (°F)	24 (75)	24 (75)	23 (74)	23 (74)	23 (73)	24 (75)	23 (74)	24 (75)	24 (75)	23 (74)	24 (75)	24 (75)	24 (75)
Average precipitation mm (inches)	290 (11.4)	370 (14.6)	610 (24.1)	130 (5.2)	230 (9)	110 (4.5)	280 (11)	150 (6)	150 (5.8)	170 (6.8)	310 (12.4)	210 (8.4)	3,030 (119.1)
Source: Weatherbase

Climate data for Gizo (Köppen Af)
Month	Jan	Feb	Mar	Apr	May	Jun	Jul	Aug	Sep	Oct	Nov	Dec	Year
Mean daily maximum °C (°F)	30.9 (87.6)	30.8 (87.4)	30.7 (87.3)	30.4 (86.7)	30.4 (86.7)	29.9 (85.8)	29.2 (84.6)	29.3 (84.7)	29.8 (85.6)	30.5 (86.9)	30.8 (87.4)	31.0 (87.8)	30.3 (86.5)
Daily mean °C (°F)	27.4 (81.3)	27.3 (81.1)	27.2 (81.0)	27.0 (80.6)	27.1 (80.8)	26.7 (80.1)	26.3 (79.3)	26.2 (79.2)	26.6 (79.9)	27.0 (80.6)	27.2 (81.0)	27.4 (81.3)	26.9 (80.5)
Mean daily minimum °C (°F)	23.9 (75.0)	23.8 (74.8)	23.8 (74.8)	23.7 (74.7)	23.8 (74.8)	23.5 (74.3)	23.4 (74.1)	23.2 (73.8)	23.4 (74.1)	23.5 (74.3)	23.7 (74.7)	23.8 (74.8)	23.6 (74.5)
Average precipitation mm (inches)	413 (16.3)	353 (13.9)	385 (15.2)	292 (11.5)	272 (10.7)	258 (10.2)	367 (14.4)	285 (11.2)	267 (10.5)	247 (9.7)	246 (9.7)	284 (11.2)	3,669 (144.5)
Source: Climate-Data.org

== Forests ==
=== Tree cover extent and loss ===
Global Forest Watch publishes annual estimates of tree cover loss and 2000 tree cover extent derived from time-series analysis of Landsat satellite imagery in the Global Forest Change dataset. In this framework, tree cover refers to vegetation taller than 5 m (including natural forests and tree plantations), and tree cover loss is defined as the complete removal of tree cover canopy for a given year, regardless of cause.

For the Solomon Islands, country statistics report cumulative tree cover loss of 239,794 ha (2,397.94 km^{2}) from 2001 to 2024 (about 8.7% of its 2000 tree cover area). For tree cover density greater than 30%, country statistics report a 2000 tree cover extent of 2,741,593 ha (27,415.93 km^{2}). The charts and table below display this data. In simple terms, the annual loss number is the area where tree cover disappeared in that year, and the extent number shows what remains of the 2000 tree cover baseline after subtracting cumulative loss. Forest regrowth is not included in the dataset.

Annual tree cover loss in the Solomon Islands, 2001–2024. View chart definition.
Tree cover extent in 2000 minus cumulative tree cover loss in the Solomon Islands, 2001–2024 (loss-only residual; does not account for gain). View chart definition.

Annual tree cover extent and loss
Year	Tree cover extent (km2) (Note: This residual measure does not include forest regrowth.)	Annual tree cover loss (km2)
2001	27,394.06	21.87
2002	27,355.40	38.66
2003	27,331.65	23.75
2004	27,296.22	35.43
2005	27,230.74	65.48
2006	27,180.06	50.68
2007	27,123.40	56.66
2008	27,041.68	81.72
2009	26,981.34	60.34
2010	26,917.16	64.18
2011	26,858.56	58.60
2012	26,770.48	88.08
2013	26,675.77	94.71
2014	26,506.38	169.39
2015	26,356.68	149.70
2016	26,176.76	179.92
2017	25,979.15	197.61
2018	25,800.91	178.24
2019	25,635.40	165.51
2020	25,489.42	145.98
2021	25,369.41	120.01
2022	25,224.38	145.03
2023	25,128.61	95.77
2024	25,017.99	110.62

=== REDD+ reference level and monitoring ===
Under the UNFCCC REDD+ framework, Solomon Islands has submitted a national forest reference level (FRL). On the UNFCCC REDD+ Web Platform, the country's 2019 submission is listed as having an assessed reference level, while a national strategy, safeguards information and a national forest monitoring system are all listed as "not reported".

The first assessed FRL, technically assessed in 2019, covered three REDD+ activities at national scale: reducing emissions from deforestation, reducing emissions from forest degradation, and enhancement of forest carbon stocks, although the technical assessment notes that no emissions or removals for enhancement were included. Using a 2001-2017 reference period, the assessed FRL set annual benchmark values for 2018-2021 of 15,335,717, 16,181,627, 17,027,538 and 17,873,448 t CO2 eq per year. The technical assessment states that it included above-ground biomass and below-ground biomass, reported CO2 only, and used a forest definition of land spanning more than 1 hectare, with trees higher than 5 metres and canopy cover above 10 percent, excluding land predominantly under agricultural or urban use.

== Statistics ==
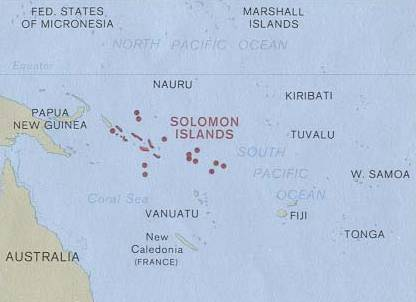
Solomon Islands in relation to the rest of Oceania.

Geographic coordinates: 8°00′S 159°00′E

Area:
total: 29,000 km^{2} (11,000 sq mi)
land: 27,986 km^{2} (10,805 sq mi)
water: 1,014 km^{2} (392 sq mi)

Coastline: 5,313 km

Maritime claims:
Measured from claimed archipelagic baselines
continental shelf: 200 nmi (230 mi; 370 km)
exclusive economic zone: 1,589,477 km^{2} (613,701 mi^{2}) (200 nmi)
territorial sea: 12 nmi (14 mi; 22 km)

Terrain: Mostly rugged mountains with some low coral atolls

Elevation extremes:
lowest point: Pacific Ocean 0 m
highest point: Mount Popomanaseu 2,332 m (7,651 ft) (not Mount Makarakomburu)

Natural resources: fish, forests, gold, bauxite, phosphates, lead, zinc, nickel

Land use:
arable land: 0.62%
permanent crops: 2.04%
other: 97.34% (2005)

Irrigated land: NA

Natural hazards: Tropical cyclones, heavy rain, floods, tsunamis; earthquakes; volcanic activity

Environment – current issues: Deforestation; soil erosion; much of the surrounding coral reefs are dead or dying

Environment – international agreements:
party to: Biodiversity, Climate Change, Climate Change-Kyoto Protocol, Desertification, Environmental Modification, Law of the Sea, Marine Dumping, Marine Life Conservation, Ozone Layer Protection, Whaling

== Extreme points ==
This is a list of the extreme points of Solomon Islands, the points that are farther north, south, east or west than any other location.

- Northernmost point – Ontong Java Atoll, Malaita Province
- Easternmost point – Fatutaka, Santa Cruz Islands, Temotu Province
- Southernmost point – South Reef, Indispensable Reef, Rennell and Bellona Province
- Westernmost point – Mono Island, Treasury Islands, Western Province

== See also ==
- List of mammals of the Solomon Islands archipelago
- Provinces of Solomon Islands
