= Mount Gauttier =

Mountain in Indonesia

- Location within Papua (province) Location within Indonesia

Highest point
- Elevation: 2,230 m (7,320 ft)
- Prominence: 2,007 m (6,585 ft)
- Listing: Ultra
- Coordinates: 2°36′14″S 138°56′58″E

Geography
- Country: Indonesia
- Province: Papua
- Parent range: Northern New Guinea Coast

Mount Gauttier is a mountain located in Papua, Indonesia. Gauttier is an ultra-prominent peak and is the 28th highest in Oceania. It has an elevation of 2,230 m (7,320 ft).

== See also ==
- List of ultras of the Malay Archipelago
- List of ultras of Oceania
