= Lakes of Solomon Islands =

The Lakes of Solomon Islands are the naturally occurring bodies of water found within the geographical boundaries of the Solomon Islands, an island country located in the South Pacific Ocean east of Papua New Guinea.

== Overview ==
The Solomon Islands consist of six major islands and over 900 smaller islands, many of which possess their own freshwater bodies, including lakes and lagoons. Lakes in this country vary in their origins and characteristics, reflecting the rich geodiversity of the Solomon Islands. While some are the result of volcanic activity, others are formed due to tectonic processes or as a result of the accumulation of rainwater.

== Major Lakes ==
=== Lake Tegano ===
Lake Tegano, previously known as Lake Te Nggano, is the largest lake in the Solomon Islands and the Pacific region. It is located on Rennell Island and is the largest raised coral atoll in the world. The lake has been recognized as a World Heritage Site by UNESCO since 1998 due to its biodiversity and geological values.

== See also ==
1. Solomon Islands

2. Geography of the Solomon Islands
