= Mount Taylor (New Zealand) =

Mountain in Canterbury, New Zealand

- Location within South Island Location within New Zealand

Highest point
- Elevation: 2,333 m (7,654 ft)
- Prominence: 1,636 m (5,367 ft)
- Isolation: 28.53 km (17.73 mi)
- Listing: Ultra
- Coordinates: 43°30′27″S 171°19′7″E

Geography
- Parent range: Lesser South Island

Mount Taylor is a mountain located in Canterbury, New Zealand. Mount Taylor is an ultra-prominent peak and is the 54th highest in Oceania. It has an elevation of 2,333 m (7,654 ft).

== See also ==
- List of ultras of Oceania
