= Mont Ross =

Stratovolcano in the Kerguelen Islands

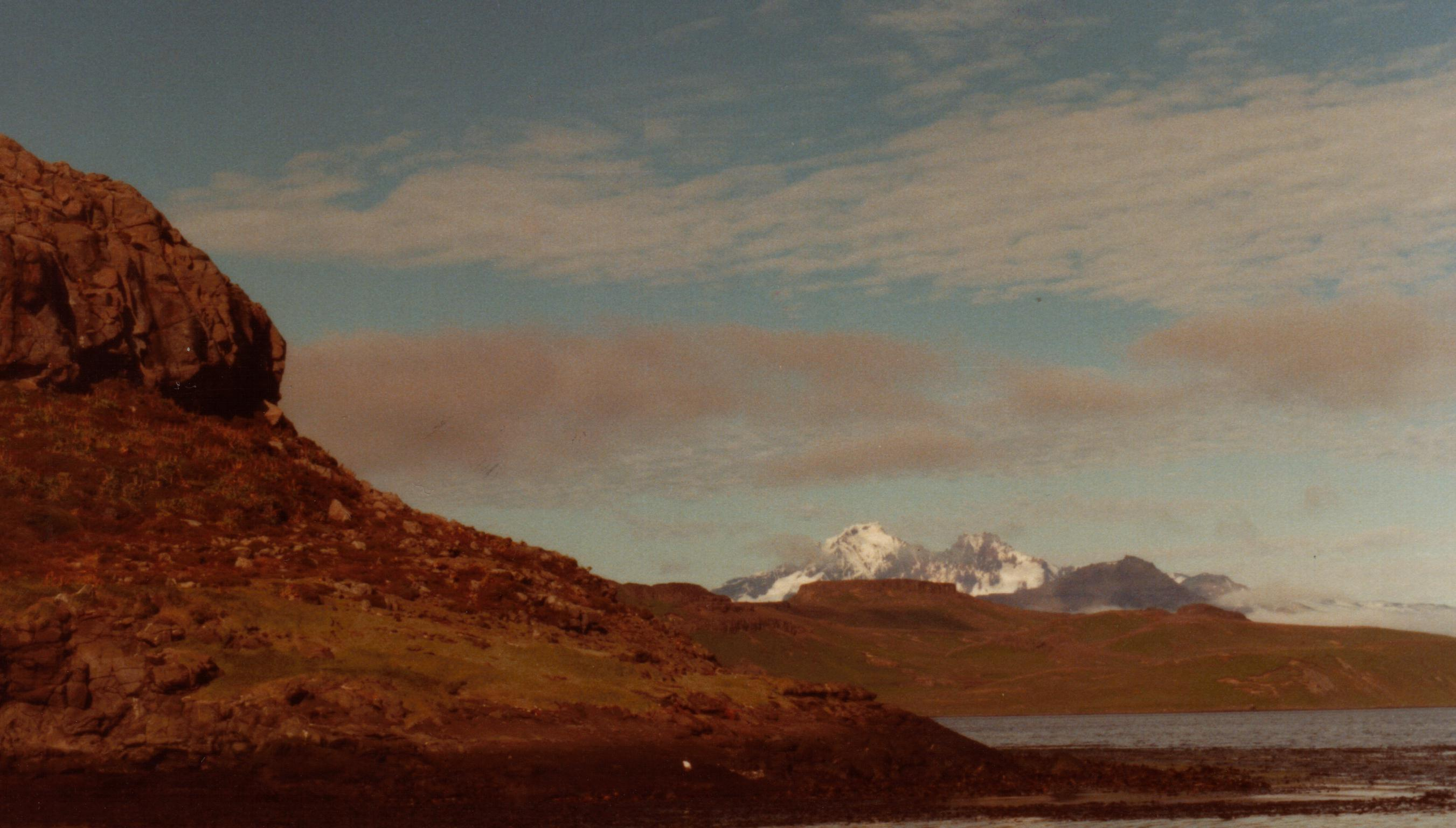
- Mont Ross on the other side of the Golfe de Morbihan

Highest point
- Elevation: 1,850 m (6,070 ft)
- Prominence: 1,850 m (6,070 ft)
- Listing: Ultra; Ribu
- Coordinates: 49°35′32″S 69°29′45″E

Geography
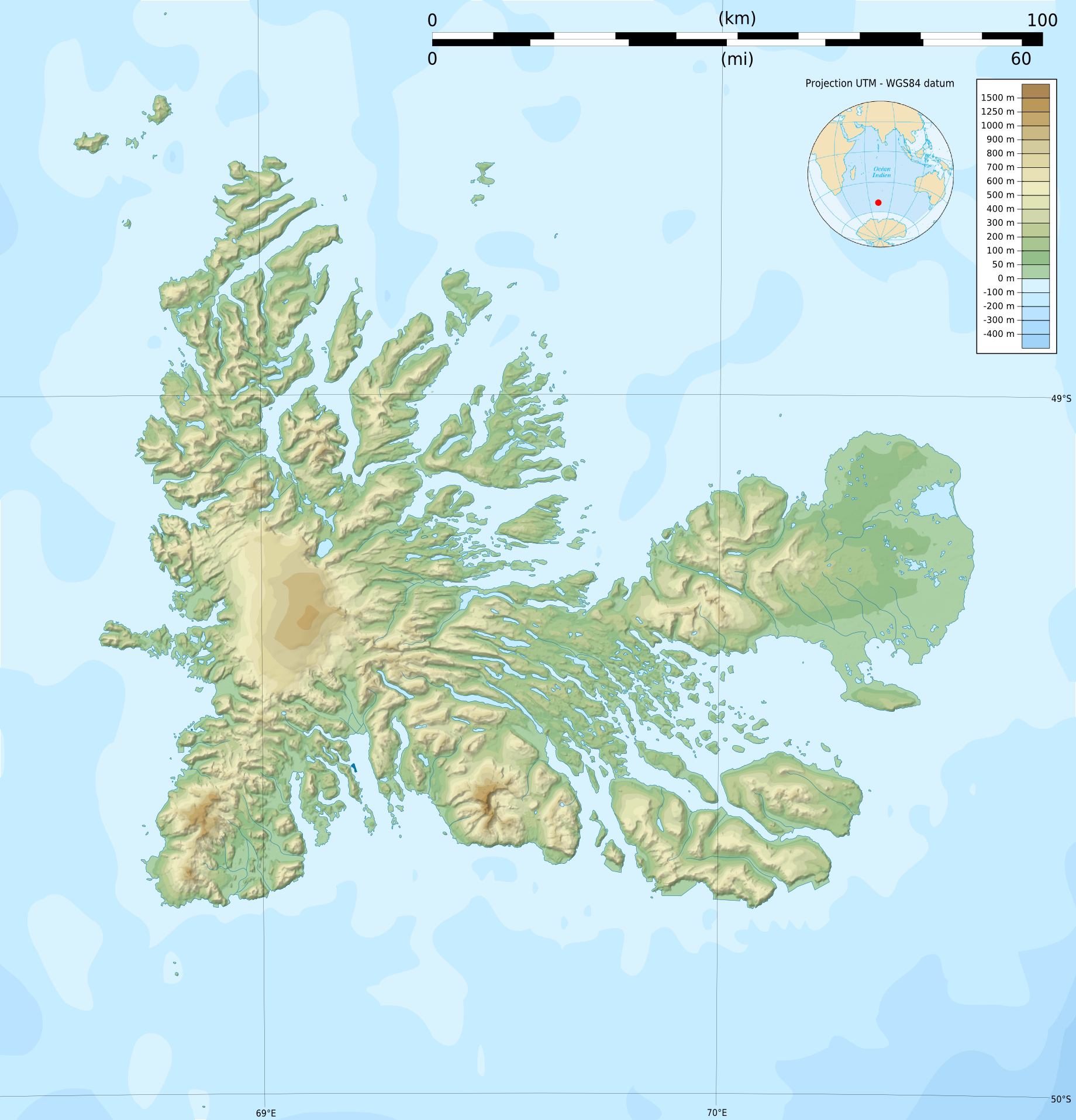
- Location within Kerguelen
- Location: Kerguelen Islands, southern Indian Ocean France
- Parent range: Gallieni Massif

Geology
- Rock age: 66 million years
- Mountain type: Stratovolcano
- Last eruption: 101BCE

Climbing
- First ascent: 1975
- Easiest route: Unknown

Mont Ross is a stratovolcano, the highest mountain in the Kerguelen Islands at 1,850 metres (6,070 ft). It is located in the Gallieni Massif, at the end of the Gallieni Peninsula, east of Baie Larose on the main island of Grande Terre. The volcano is composed primarily of trachybasalt and was active during the late Pleistocene. Eruptives have been dated between 2 million years to 100,000 years old.

== History ==
Mont Ross was named after explorer Sir James Clark Ross. The first human being to set foot on its summit was French military engineer Henri Journoud, using a helicopter, in the early 1960s. The mountain was, however, first climbed in 1975 by Jean Afanassieff and Patrick Cordier, and is the last French mountain to be climbed.

== Photos ==
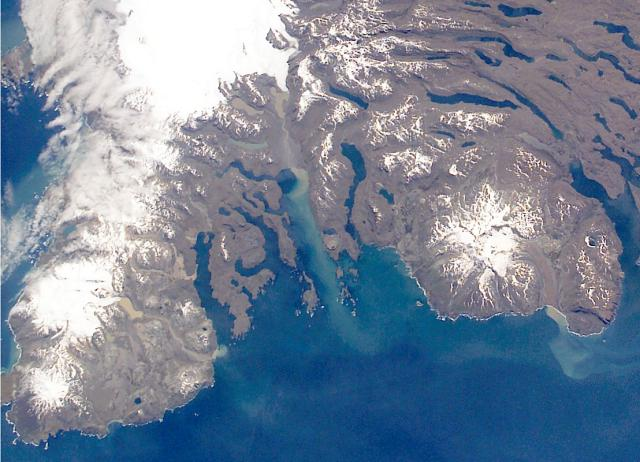
The southern part of the Kerguelen Islands, with Mont Ross at right (white spot, top of image is north) and on the left, the Glacier Cook (white spot) and the Peninsula Rallier du Baty.

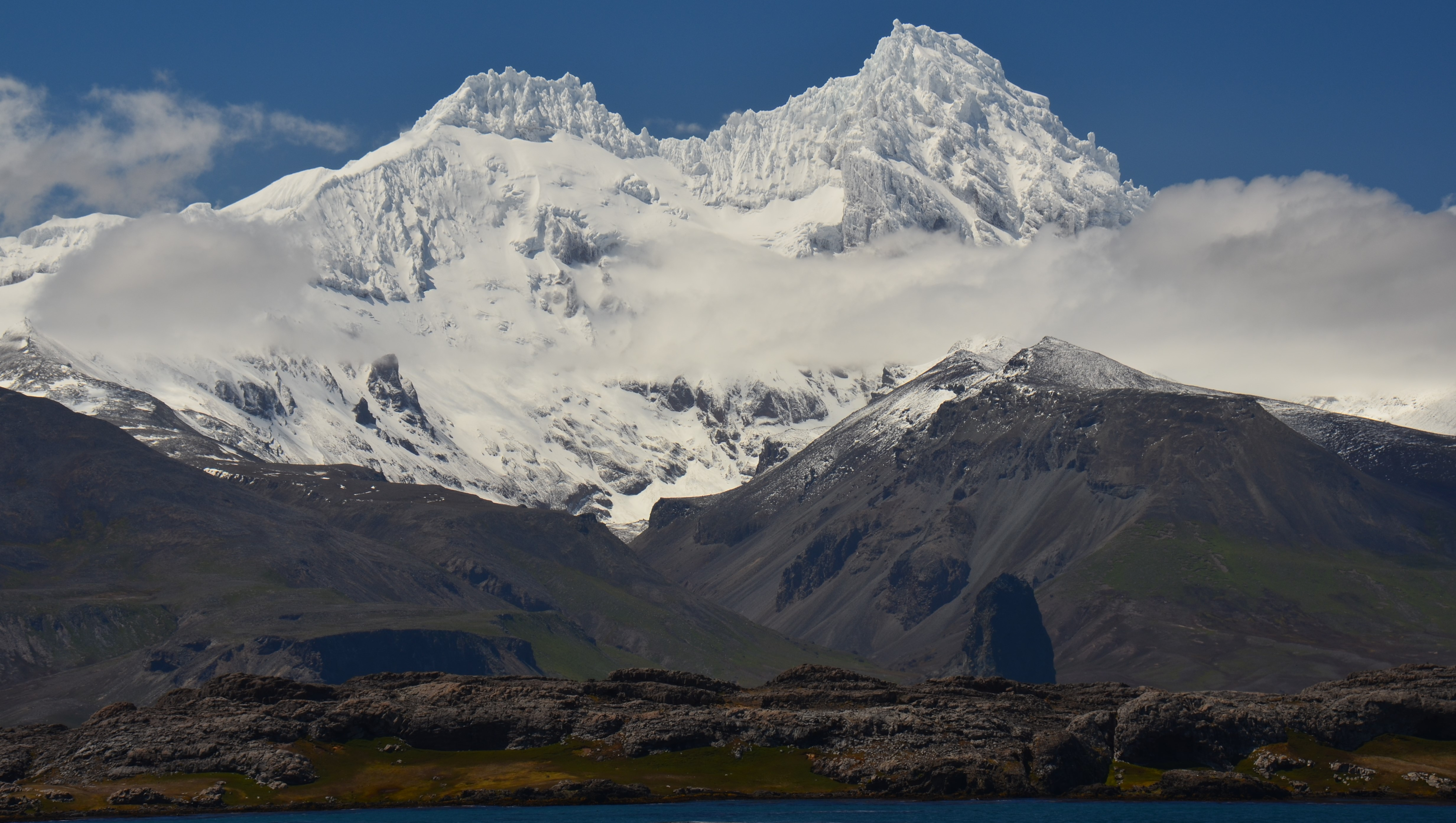
Mont Ross in December 2013 (austral summer) shoot from the French research and supply vessel Marion Dufresne

== See also ==
- List of Ultras of Oceania
- List of islands by highest point
