= Undundi-Wandandi =

Mountain in Indonesia

- Location within Indonesia

Highest point
- Elevation: 3,640 m (11,940 ft)
- Prominence: 1,732 m (5,682 ft)
- Isolation: 56.44 km (35.07 mi)
- Listing: Ultra
- Coordinates: 3°30′24″S 136°25′22″E

Geography
- Country: Indonesia
- Parent range: Maoke

Undundi-Wandandi is a mountain located in Papua, Indonesia. Undundi-Wandandi is an ultra-prominent peak and is the 47th highest in Oceania. It has an elevation of 3,640 m (11,940 ft).

== See also ==
- List of ultras of the Malay Archipelago
- List of ultras of Oceania
