= List of ultras of Oceania =

Overview of ultra-prominent peaks in Oceania

This is a list of the 67 ultra-prominent peaks (with topographic prominence greater than 1,500 metres (4,921 ft)) of Oceania, plus the two Ultras of the Southern Indian Ocean.

== Western New Guinea ==
There are 12 ultra-prominent summits in Papua, Indonesia.

Rank	Peak	Country	Island	Elevation (m)	Prominence (m)	Col (m)
1	Puncak Jaya (Carstensz Pyramid)	Indonesia	New Guinea	4,884	4,884	0
2	Pegunungan Arfak	Indonesia	New Guinea	2,955	2,775	179
3	Puncak Mandala	Indonesia	New Guinea	4,760	2,760	2000
4	Mount Kobowre	Indonesia	New Guinea	3,750	2,217	1533
5	Mount Gauttier	Indonesia	New Guinea	2,230	2,007	223
6	Mount Wondiwoi	Indonesia	New Guinea	2,180	1,985	195
7	Bon Irau	Indonesia	New Guinea	2,500	1,900	600
8	Mount Cycloop	Indonesia	New Guinea	2,000	1,876	124
9	Undundi-Wandandi	Indonesia	New Guinea	3,640	1,740	1900
10	Mount Kumawa	Indonesia	New Guinea	1,680	1,636	44
11	Angemuk	Indonesia	New Guinea	3,949	1,565	2384
12	Deyjay	Indonesia	New Guinea	3,340	1,555	1785

== Papua New Guinea ==
There are 31 ultra-prominent summits in Papua New Guinea.

Rank	Peak	Country	Island	Elevation (m)	Prominence (m)	Col (m)
1	Finisterre Range High Point	Papua New Guinea	New Guinea	4,175	3,734	441
2	Mount Suckling	Papua New Guinea	New Guinea	3,676	2,976	700
3	Mount Wilhelm	Papua New Guinea	New Guinea	4,509	2,969	1540
4	Mount Victoria	Papua New Guinea	New Guinea	4,038	2,738	1300
5	Mount Balbi	Papua New Guinea	Bougainville Island	2,715	2,715	0
6	Mount Oiautukekea	Papua New Guinea	Goodenough Island	2,536	2,536	0
7	Mount Giluwe	Papua New Guinea	New Guinea	4,367	2,507	1860
8	Mount Taron	Papua New Guinea	New Ireland	2,379	2,379	0
9	Mount Ulawun	Papua New Guinea	New Britain	2,334	2,334	0
10	Mount Kabangama	Papua New Guinea	New Guinea	4,104	2,284	1820
11	Nakanai Mountains High Point	Papua New Guinea	New Britain	2,316	2,056	260
12	Mount Kilkerran	Papua New Guinea	Fergusson Island	1,947	1,947	0
13	Mount Piora	Papua New Guinea	New Guinea	3,557	1,897	1660
14	Mount Bosavi	Papua New Guinea	New Guinea	2,507	1,887	620
15	Mount Karoma	Papua New Guinea	New Guinea	3,623	1,883	1740
16	Mount Simpson	Papua New Guinea	New Guinea	2,883	1,863	1020
17	Mount Kunugui	Papua New Guinea	Karkar Island	1,833	1,833	0
18	Mount Victory	Papua New Guinea	New Guinea	1,891	1,831	60
19	Manam High Point	Papua New Guinea	Manam	1,807	1,807	0
20	Mount Michael	Papua New Guinea	New Guinea	3,647	1,787	1860
21	Mount Talawe	Papua New Guinea	New Britain	1,824	1,773	51
22	Barurumea Ridge	Papua New Guinea	New Britain	2,063	1,723	340
23	Mount Sarawaget	Papua New Guinea	New Guinea	4,121	1,701	2420
24	Bewani Mountains High Point	Papua New Guinea	New Guinea	1,980	1,664	316
25	Mount Bel	Papua New Guinea	Umboi Island	1,658	1,658	0
26	unnamed summit	Papua New Guinea	New Britain	1,951	1,651	300
27	Mount Maybole	Papua New Guinea	Fergusson Island	1,665	1,597	68
28	Adelbert Range High Point	Papua New Guinea	New Guinea	1,716	1,576	140
29	Sibium Mountains High Point	Papua New Guinea	New Guinea	2,295	1,555	740
30	Mount Shungol	Papua New Guinea	New Guinea	2,752	1,518	1234
31	Mount Taraka	Papua New Guinea	Bougainville Island	2,251	1,511	740

== Hawaiian Islands ==
Of the six ultra-prominent summits of the Hawaiian Islands, two rise on the island of Hawaiʻi, two on Maui, and one each on Kauaʻi and Molokaʻi.

Rank	Summit	Country	Island	Elevation	Prominence	Isolation	Key Col	Location
1	Mauna Kea (Note: The summit of Mauna Kea is the highest point of the Island of Hawaiʻi, the U.S. State of Hawaiʻi, and all islands of the Pacific Ocean. Mauna Kea is also the tallest mountain on Earth as measured from base to summit. The shield volcano sits on the ocean floor at a depth of 5998 meters (19,678 feet) for a total height of 10,205.3 meters (33,482 feet).)	United States	Island of Hawaiʻi	4207.3 m 13,803 ft	4207 m 13,803 ft	3,947 km 2,453 mi	sea level	19.8207°N 155.4681°W
2	Haleakalā (Note: The summit of Haleakalā is the highest point of the Island of Maui and the westernmost 3000 meter (9842.5-foot) summit of the United States.)	United States	Island of Maui	3055 m 10,023 ft	3055 m 10,023 ft	121.4 km 75.4 mi	sea level	20.7097°N 156.2533°W
3	Mauna Loa (Note: The shield volcano Mauna Loa is the most voluminous mountain on Earth with an estimated volume of 74,000 km^{3} (18,000 mi^{3}), or enough material to fill the Grand Canyon more than 18 times. Mauna Loa is the southernmost and westernmost 4000-meter (13,123-foot) summit of the United States.)	United States	Island of Hawaiʻi	4169 m 13,679 ft	2164 m 7,099 ft	40.6 km 25.2 mi	2006 m 6,580 ft	19.4756°N 155.6054°W
4	Puʻu Kukui	United States	Island of Maui	1764 m 5,788 ft	1731 m 5,678 ft	34.8 km 21.6 mi	34 m 110 ft	20.8904°N 156.5863°W
5	Kawaikini (Note: The summit of Kawaikini is the highest point of the Island of Kauaʻi.)	United States	Island of Kauaʻi	1598 m 5,243 ft	1598 m 5,243 ft	327 km 203 mi	sea level	22.0586°N 159.4973°W
6	Kamakou (Note: The summit of Kamakou is the highest point of the Island of Molokaʻi.)	United States	Island of Molokaʻi	1512 m 4,961 ft	1512 m 4,961 ft	36.4 km 22.6 mi	sea level	21.1065°N 156.8682°W

== New Zealand ==
New Zealand has ten ultra-prominent summits.

Rank	Peak	Country	Island	Elevation (m)	Prominence (m)	Col (m)
1	Aoraki / Mount Cook	New Zealand	South Island	3,724	3,724	0
2	Mount Ruapehu	New Zealand	North Island	2,797	2,797	0
3	Mount Aspiring / Tititea	New Zealand	South Island	3,033	2,471	562
4	Mount Taranaki	New Zealand	North Island	2,518	2,308	210
5	Mount Tūtoko	New Zealand	South Island	2,723	2,191	532
6	Tapuae-o-Uenuku	New Zealand	South Island	2,884	2,021	863
7	Single Cone	New Zealand	South Island	2,319	1,969	350
8	Manakau	New Zealand	South Island	2,608	1,798	810
9	Mount Taylor	New Zealand	South Island	2,333	1,636	698
10	Skippers Range High Point	New Zealand	South Island	1,648	1,598	50

== Pacific Islands ==
There are six ultra-prominent summits in the Pacific Islands, not including those of New Guinea, New Zealand, and the Hawaiian Islands which are listed separately.

Rank	Peak	Country	Island	Elevation (m)	Prominence (m)	Col (m)
1	Mount Popomanaseu	Solomon Islands	Guadalcanal	2,335	2,335	0
2	Mont Orohena	French Polynesia	Tahiti	2,241	2,241	0
3	Mount Tabwemasana	Vanuatu	Espiritu Santo	1,879	1,879	0
4	Silisili	Samoa	Savai'i	1,858	1,858	0
5	Mount Veve	Solomon Islands	Kolombangara	1,768	1,768	0
6	Mont Panié	New Caledonia	Grande Terre	1,628	1,628	0

== Australia ==
The Commonwealth of Australia has two ultra-prominent summits.

Rank	Peak	Country	Landmass	Elevation (m)	Prominence (m)	Col (m)
1	Mount Kosciuszko	Australia	Australia	2,228	2,228	0
2	Mount Ossa	Australia	Tasmania	1,617	1,617	0

== Southern Indian Ocean ==
There are two ultra-prominent summits in the southern Indian Ocean.

Rank	Peak	Country	Island	Elevation (m)	Prominence (m)	Col (m)
1	Big Ben	Australia	Heard Island	2,745	2,745	0
2	Mont Ross	French Southern Territories	Kerguelen Island	1,850	1,850	0

== Gallery ==
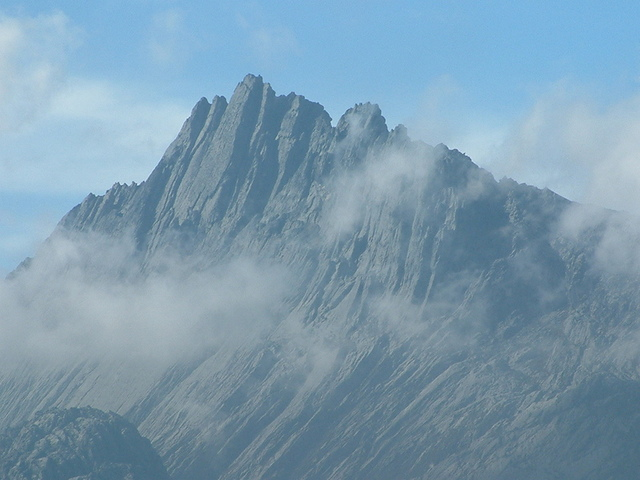
Puncak Jaya in Papua, Indonesia, is the highest point of New Guinea and all the Earth's ocean islands.

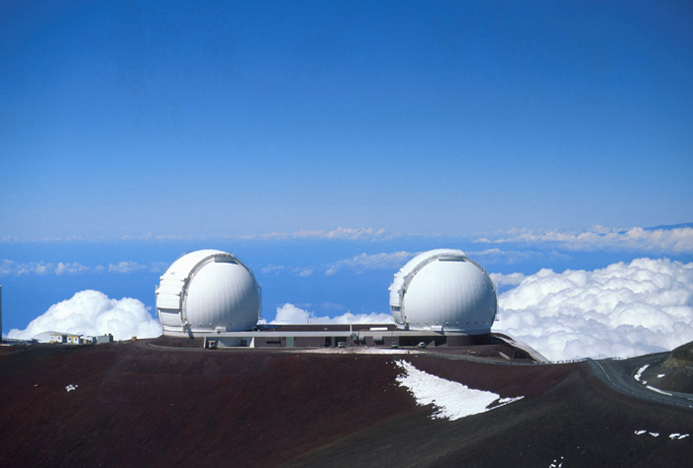
Mauna Kea on the Island of Hawaiʻi is the tallest mountain on Earth as measured from base to summit.

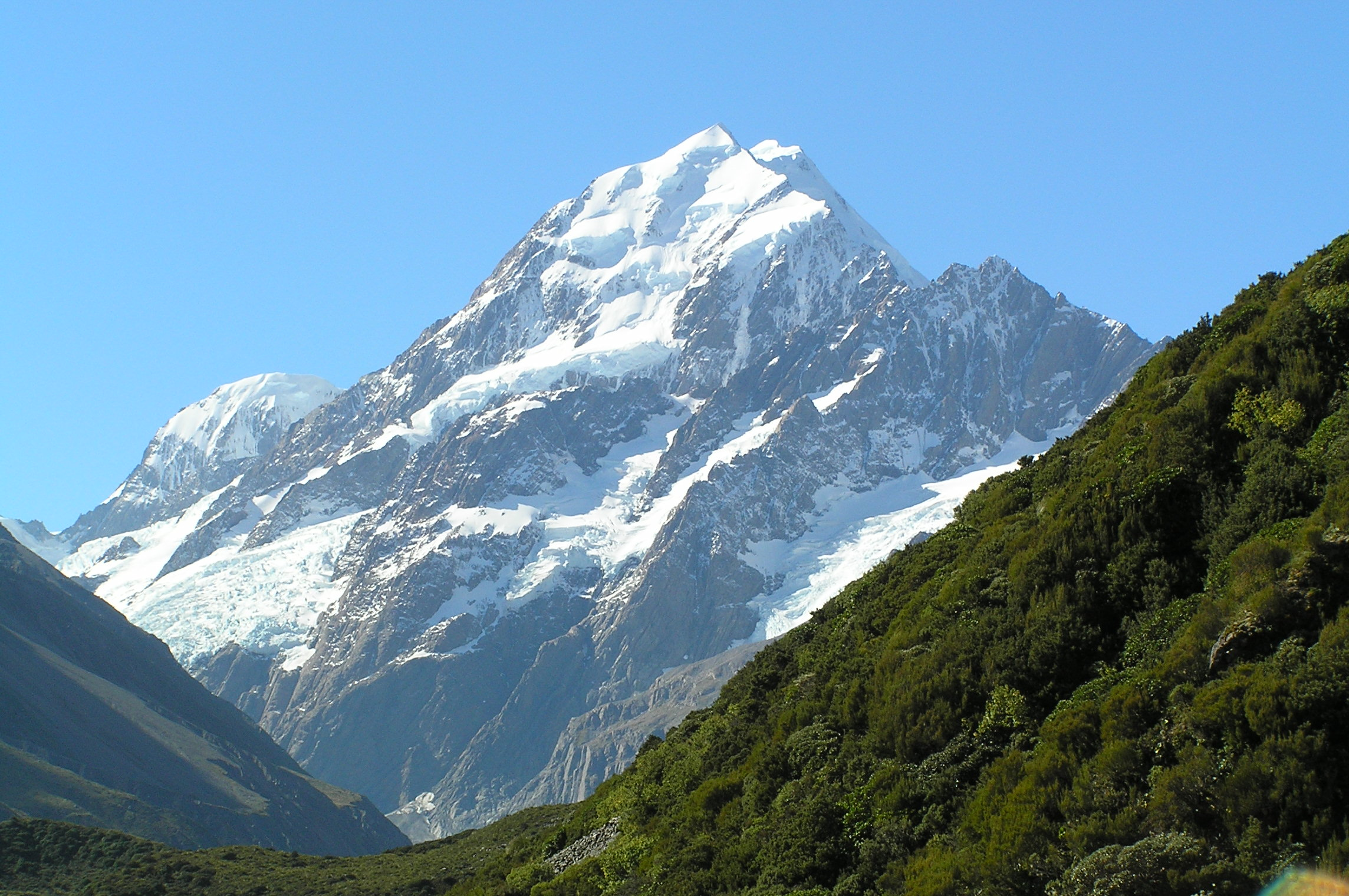
Aoraki / Mount Cook is the highest point in New Zealand and the apex of the South Island.

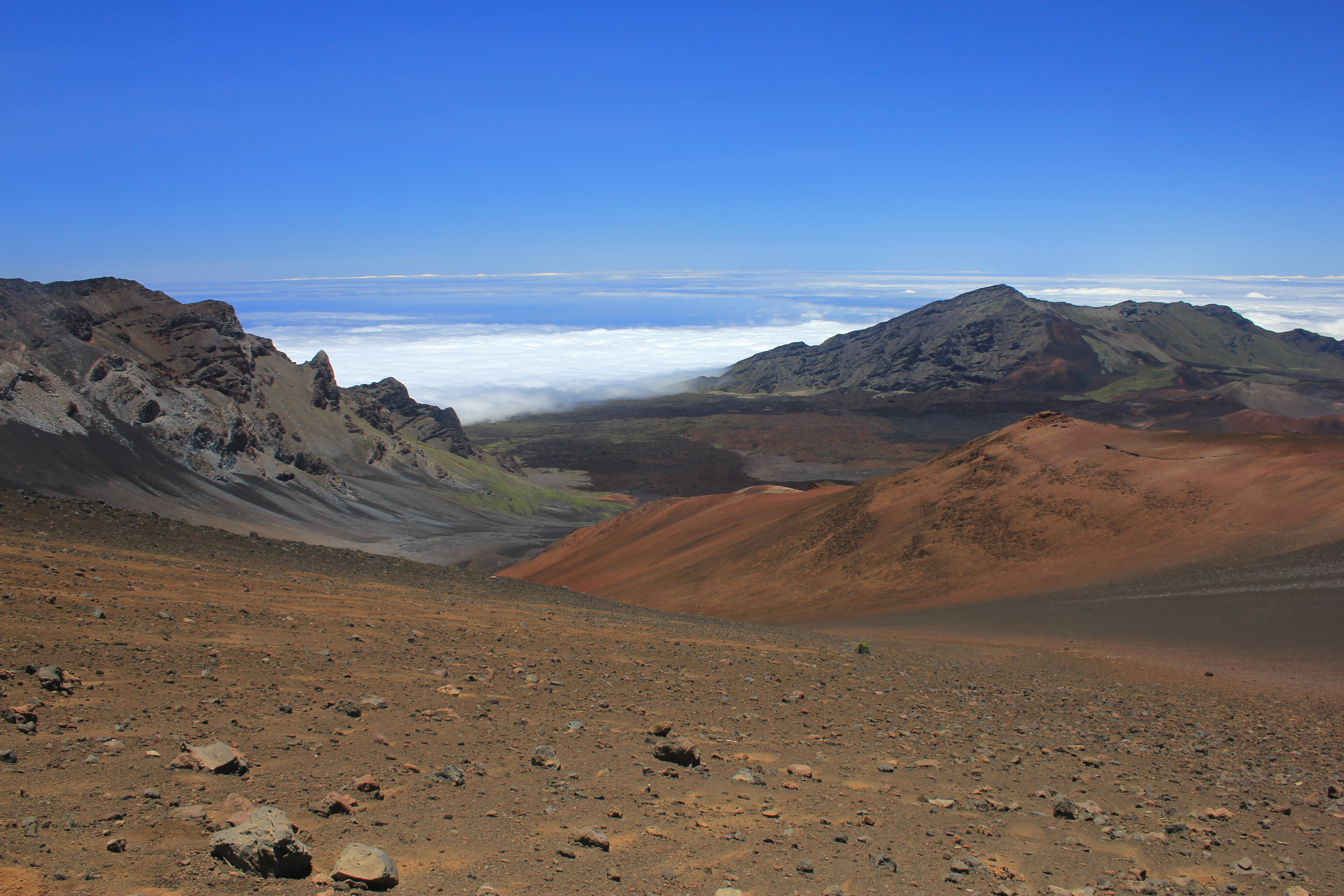
The dormant shield volcano Haleakalā is the apex of the Hawaiian Island of Maui.

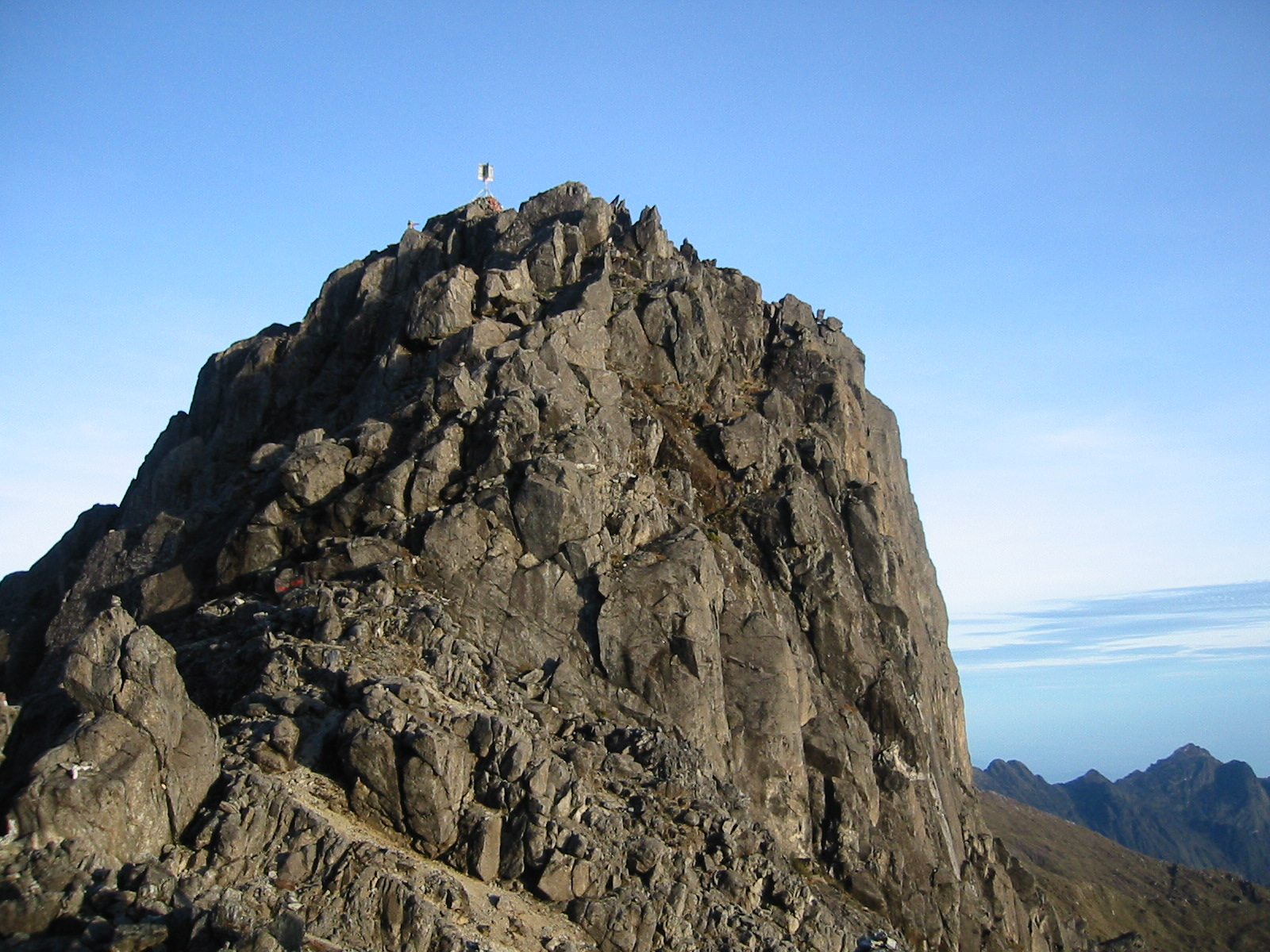
Mount Wilhelm is the highest point in Papua New Guinea.

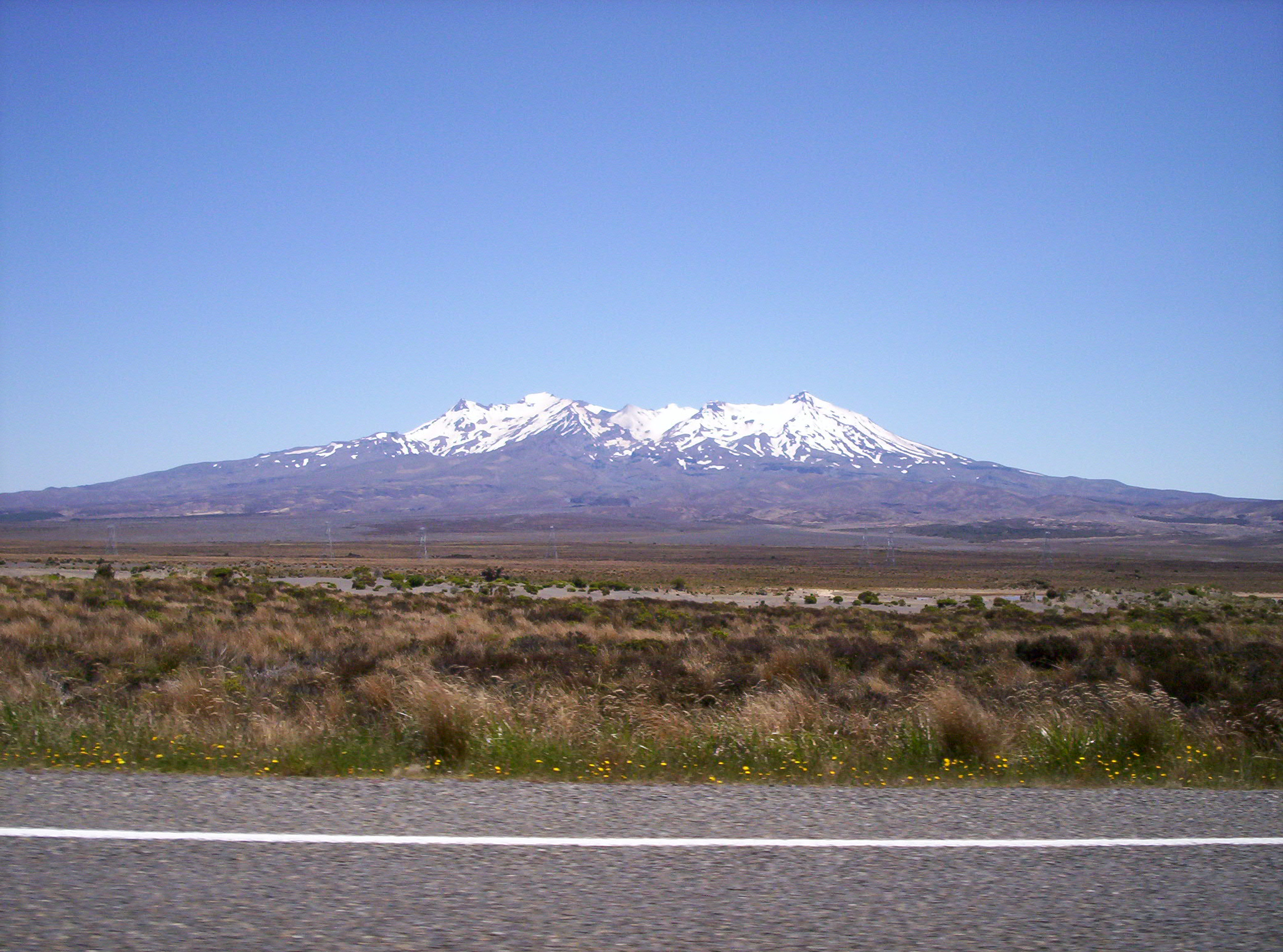
The active stratovolcano Mount Ruapehu is the apex of North Island of New Zealand.

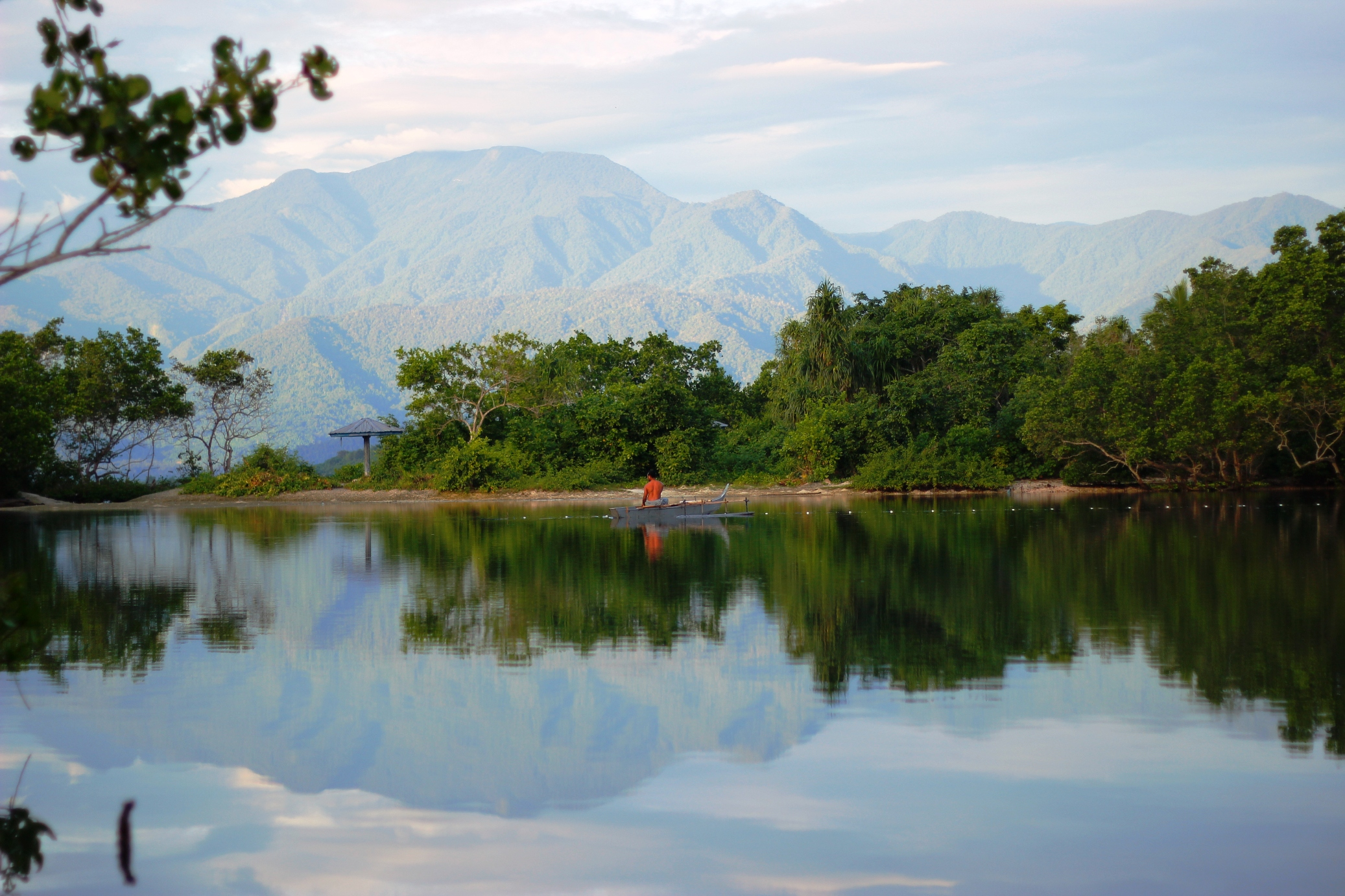
Mount Arfak is the highest point in West Papua and the Bird's Head Peninsula.

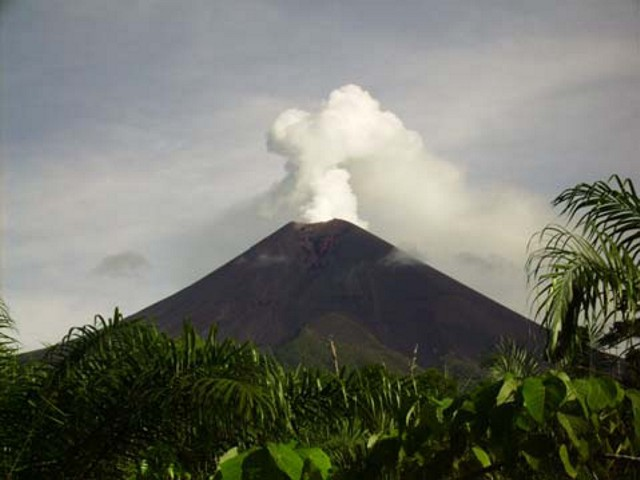
The active stratovolcano Ulawun is the apex of New Britain in Papua New Guinea.

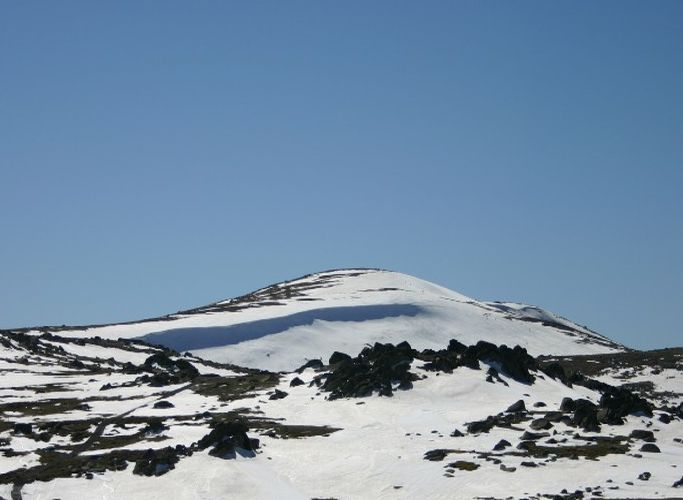
Mount Kosciuszko is the highest point of the continent and the Commonwealth of Australia.

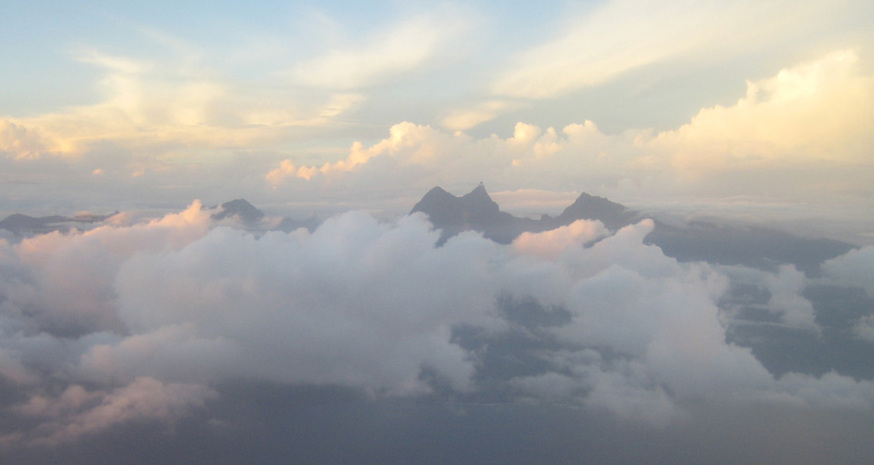
Mont Orohena is the apex of Tahiti and the highest point in French Polynesia.

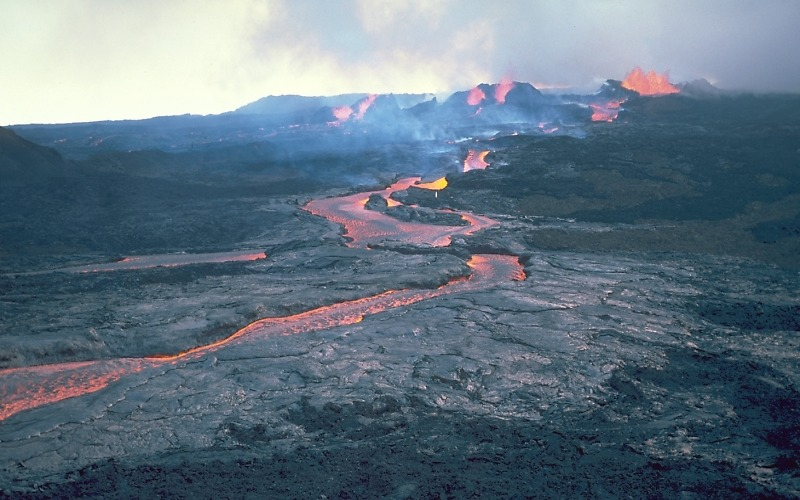
The active shield volcano Mauna Loa on the Island of Hawaiʻi is the most voluminous mountain on Earth.

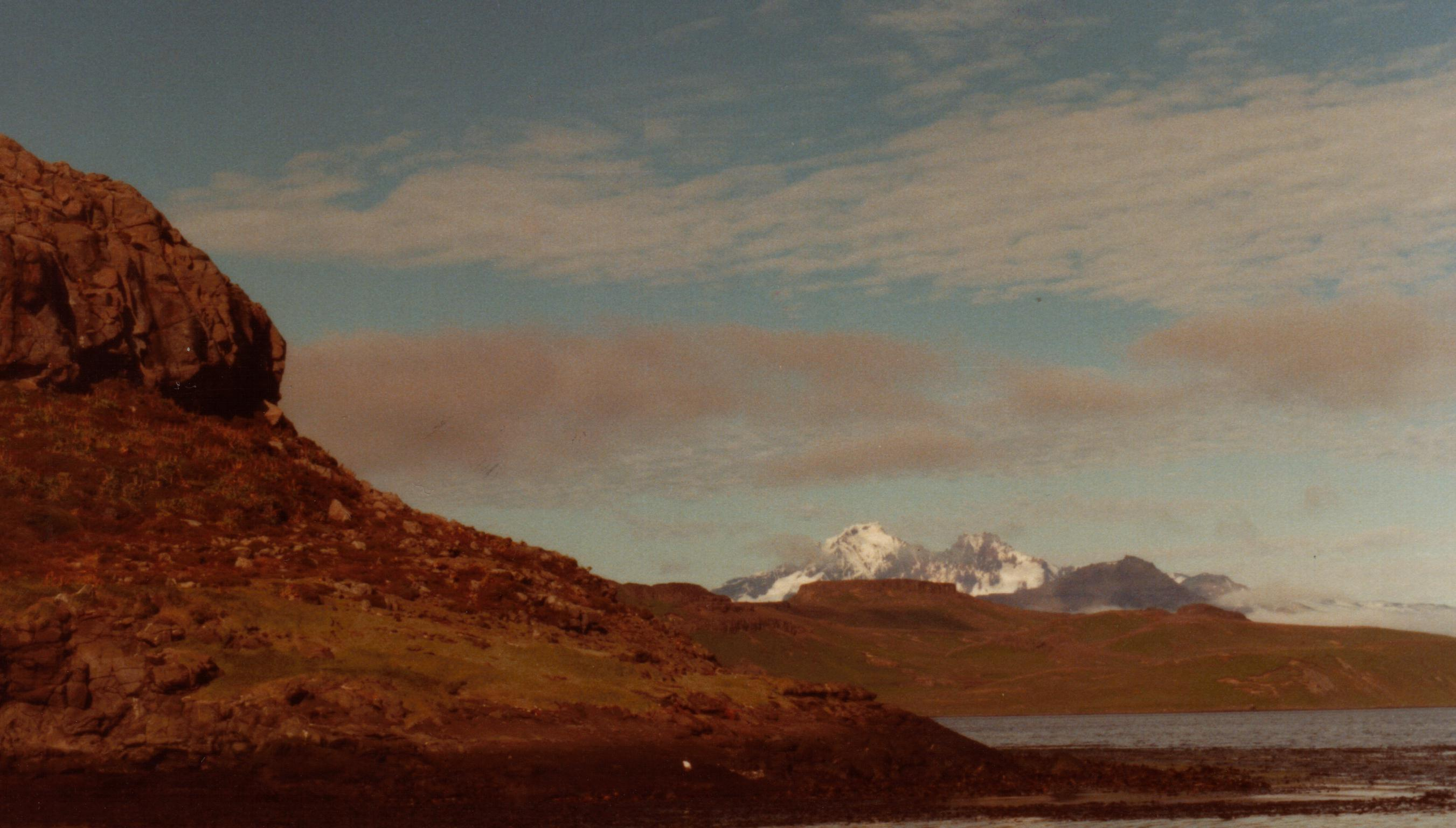
Mont Ross is the apex of Kerguelen Island

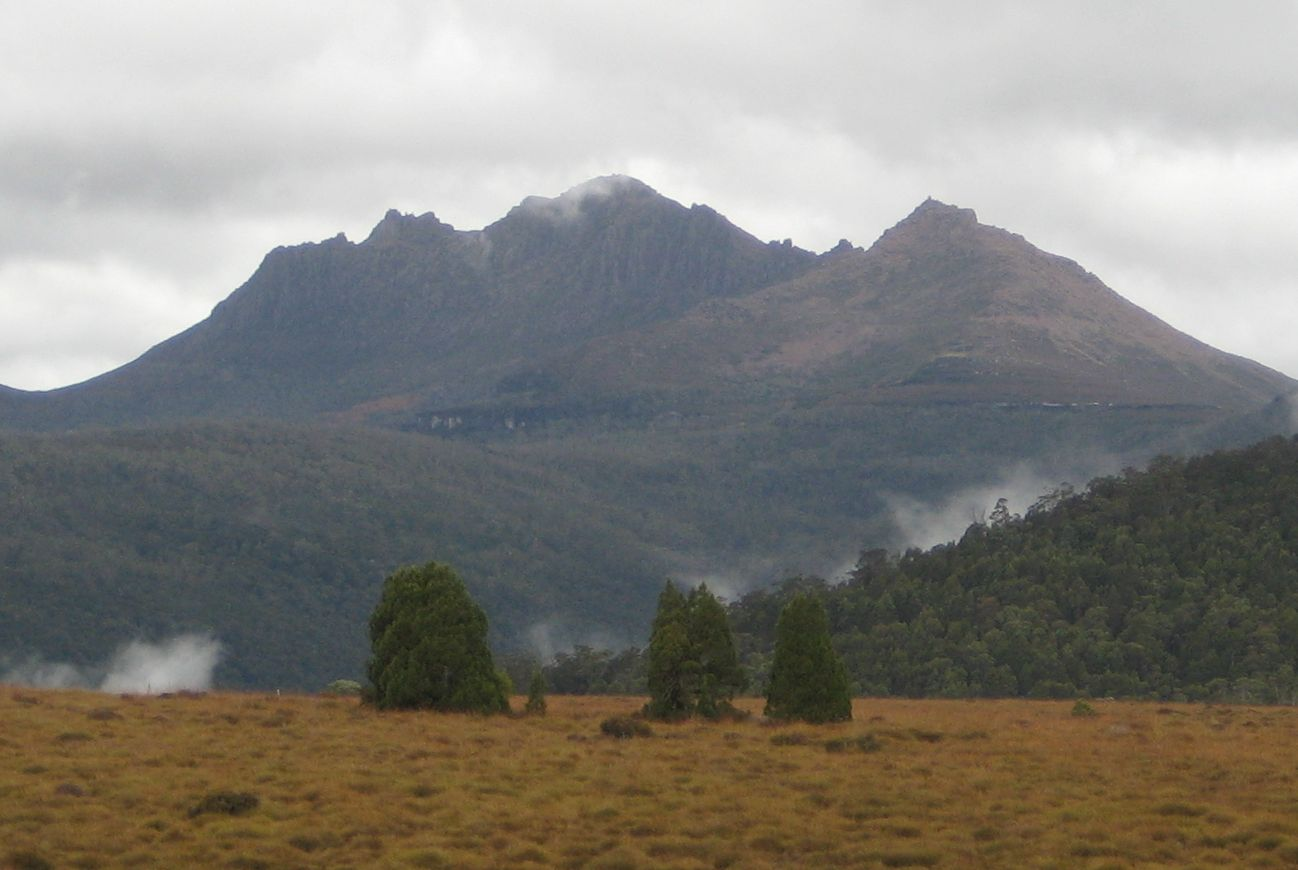
Mount Ossa is the apex of the Australian island of Tasmania.

== See also ==
- Outline of Oceania
- Mountain peaks of Hawaii
- Ultra-prominent summit

== Sources ==
- Most of Oceania
- Papua New Guinea
- Indonesia
