= Gallieni Massif =

Mountain range in Grande Terre

Massif Gallieni
- Gallieni Massif
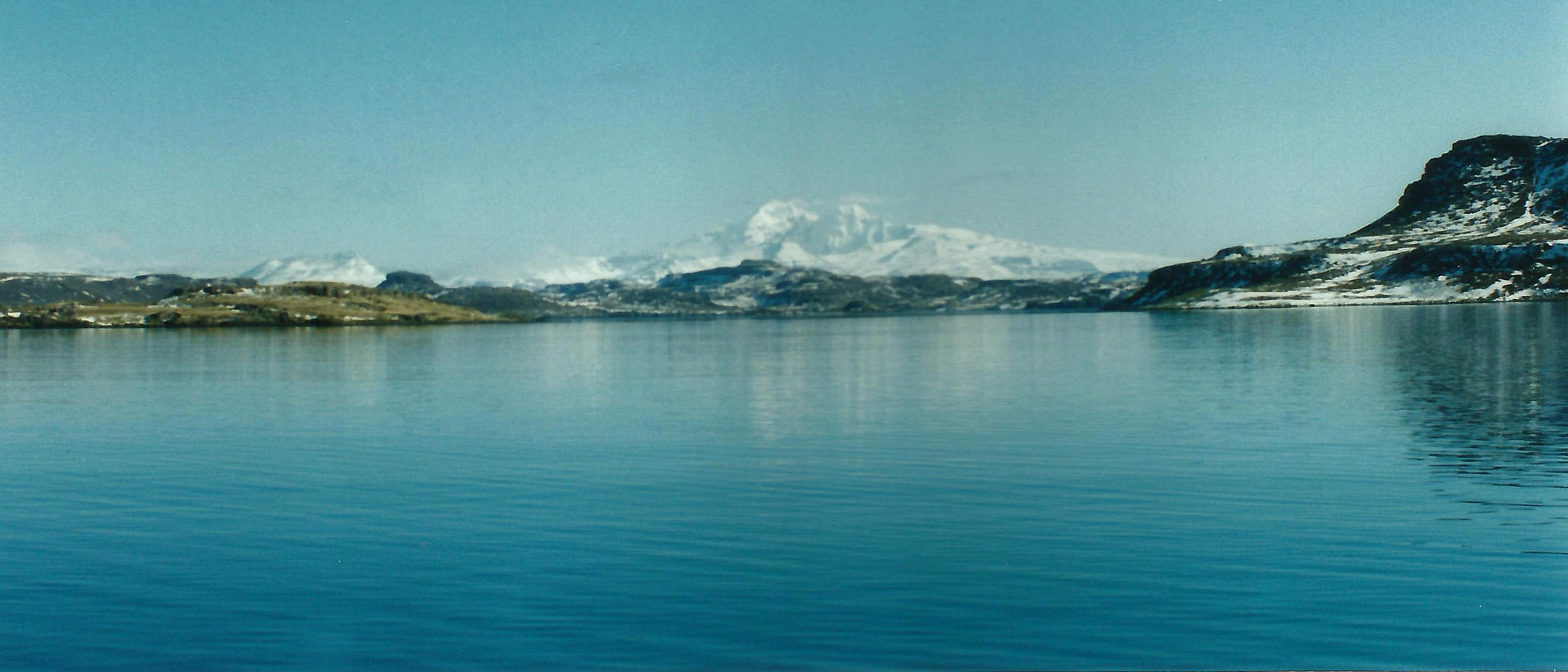
- View of the Gallieni Massif across the Morbihan Gulf

Highest point
- Peak: Mont Ross
- Elevation: 1,850 m (6,070 ft)
- Coordinates: 49°35′32″S 69°29′45″E

Dimensions
- Length: 18 km (11 mi) NW/SE
- Width: 10 km (6.2 mi) NE/SW

Geography
- Location within Indian Ocean
- Location: Grande Terre, Kerguelen( َFrance )

Geology
- Rock type: Stratovolcano

The Gallieni Massif (French: Massif Gallieni) is a mountain range in Grande Terre, the main island of Kerguelen in the French Southern Territories zone of the Southern Indian Ocean.

== Geography ==
This range is located in the Gallieni Peninsula, fringing the southern coast. The highest point of the massif is the 1,850 metres (6,070 ft) high Mont Ross, a stratovolcano that is also the highest point of the Kerguelen Archipelago.

Other important summits of the range are 1,721 metres (5,646 ft) high Petit Ross, 1,063 metres (3,488 ft) high Dôme du Père Gaspard and the 995 metres (3,264 ft) high Grand Gendarme. The range also includes a number of glacial formations, among which the Buffon Glacier, the La Pilatte Glacier, the Néves Glacier and the Sélé Glacier deserve mention.

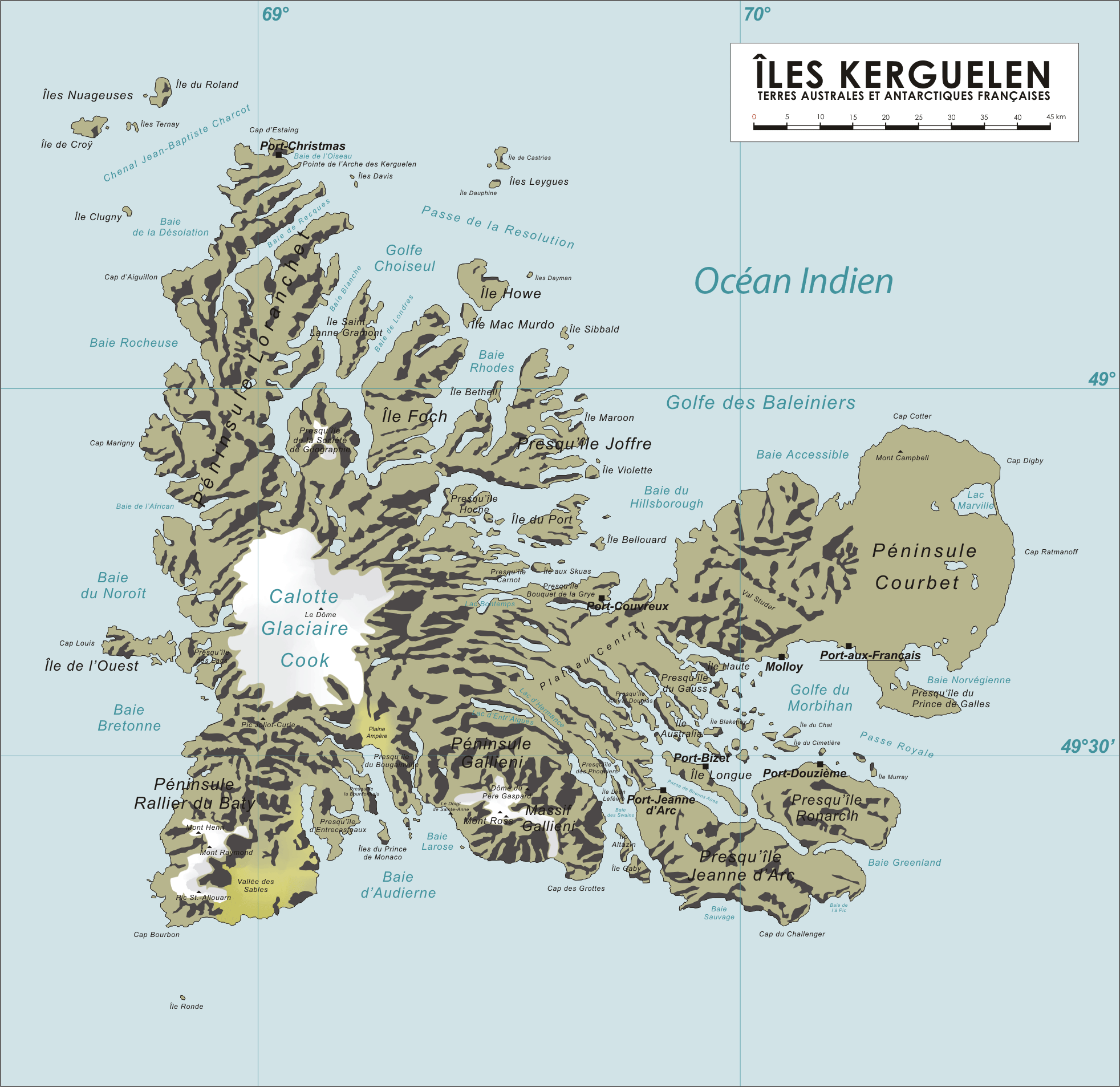
Topographic map of Kerguelen.

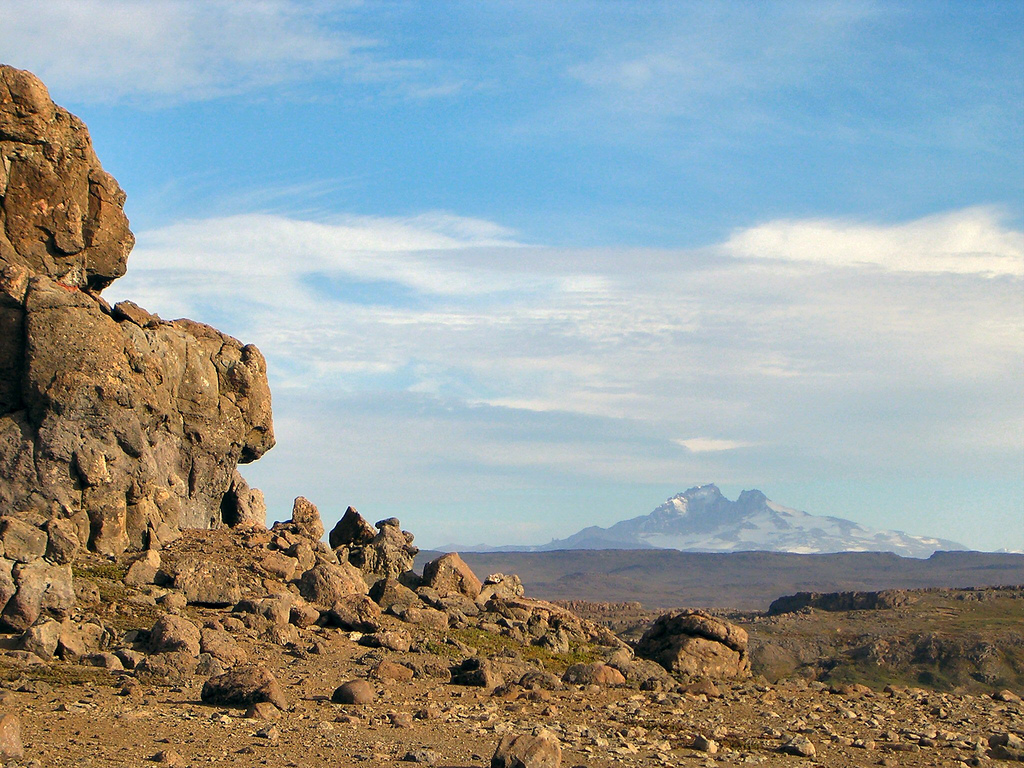
The Gallieni Massif seen from afar.

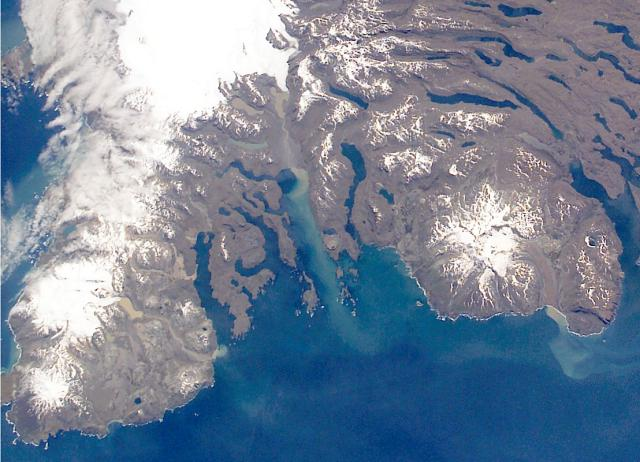
NASA picture of southeastern Kerguelen with the massif on the right

== See also ==
- Baie Larose
- List of islands by highest point
