= Mount Popomanaseu =

Mountain in the Solomon Islands

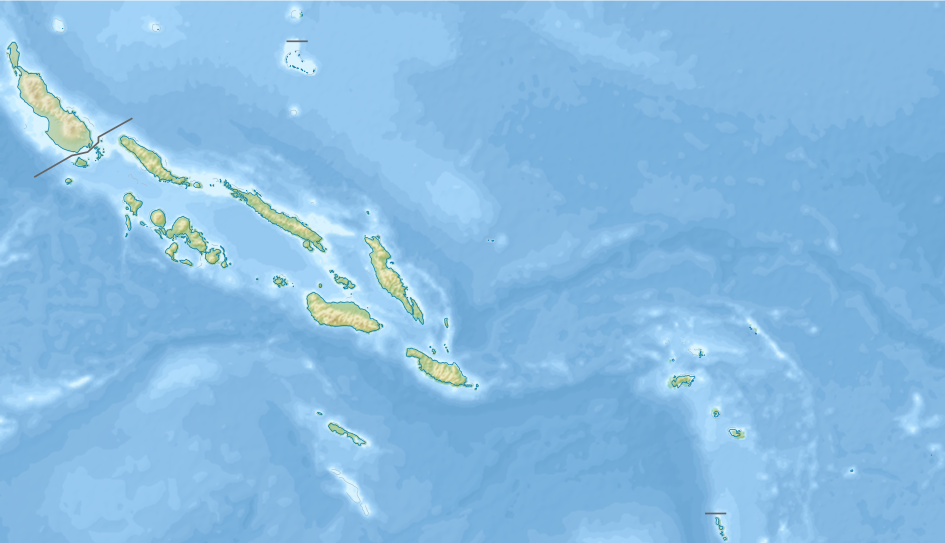
- Location within Solomon Islands

Highest point
- Elevation: 2,335 m (7,661 ft)
- Prominence: 2,335 m (7,661 ft)
- Listing: Country high point Ultra prominent peak Ribu
- Coordinates: 9°42′13″S 160°03′43″E

Geography
- Location: Guadalcanal, Solomon Islands

Mount Popomanaseu is a volcanic mountain and the highest mountain in the Solomon Islands. It is located on Guadalcanal east of Mount Makarakomburu. At 2,335 metres (7,661 ft), it is the highest peak in the insular South Pacific, excluding New Guinea and its satellite islands. Panning east across the South Pacific, there is no higher mountain until reaching the Andes in South America. The summit is a saddle plateau and can be seen on the range above Honiara International Airport. It holds significant cultural importance for the indigenous people and supports vital habitat for many endemic and restricted range species on Guadalcanal.

== See also ==
- List of ultras of Oceania
