= Baie Larose =

Bay of Grande Terre

Coordinates: 49°35′S 69°25′E

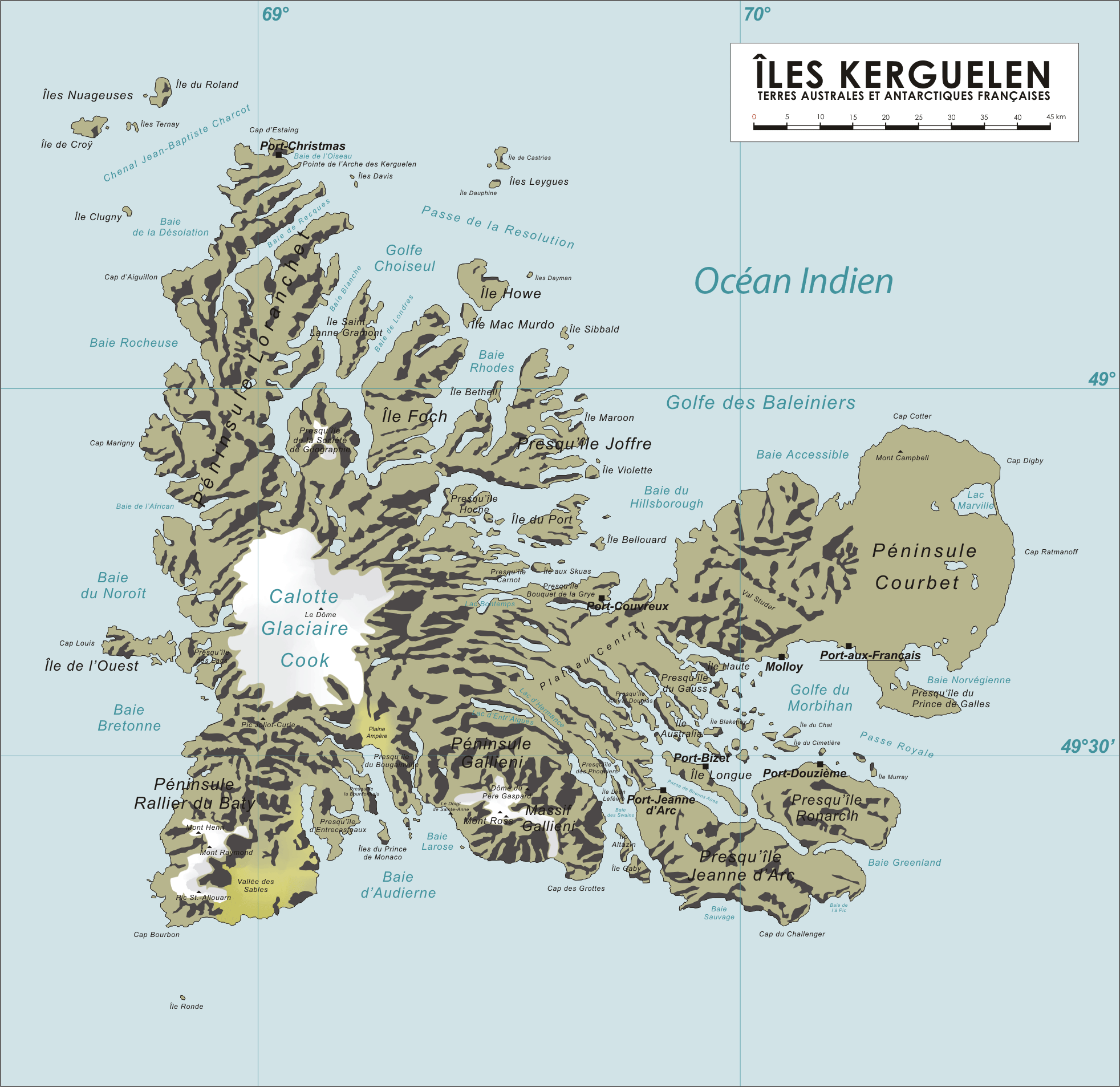
Topographic map of the Kerguelen archipelago showing the bay in the south on the western side of Péninsule Gallieni

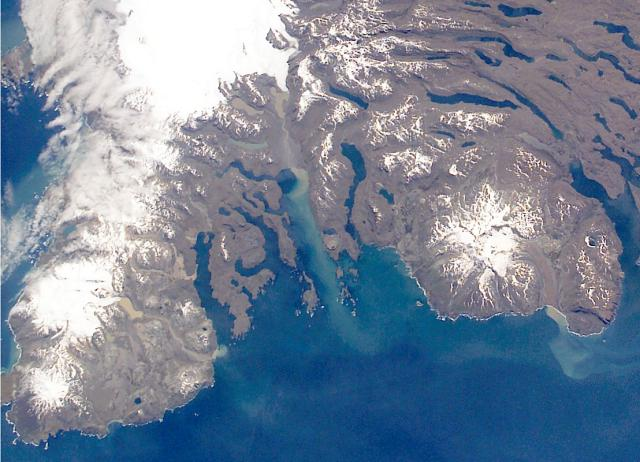
Satellite image of the two large peninsulas of Rallier du Baty (left) and Gallieni (right) with Baie Larose immediately to the left of the latter

Baie Larose (French pronunciation: [bɛ laʁoz]), or Larose Bay in English, is a bay of Grande Terre, the main island of the subantarctic Kerguelen archipelago, a French territory in the southern Indian Ocean. It is important as a breeding site for seabirds, especially penguins.

== Description ==
The bay lies on the southern coast of Grande Terre, west of Mont Ross and Gallieni Massif, and encompassing the mouth of Fjord Larose and the tilted monolith known as the Doigt de Sainte Anne (Saint Anne's Finger).

== Important Bird Area ==
The bay, with part of the south-western slopes of Mont Ross, has been identified as a 20 km^{2} Important Bird Area (IBA) by BirdLife International because of its breeding seabirds. Of the penguins, there are some 21,500 pairs of kings, 500 pairs of gentoos, 6000 pairs of macaronis and 4000 pairs of eastern rockhoppers. Other birds nesting in the IBA include a few pairs of wandering albatrosses, Antarctic and slender-billed prions, white-chinned, northern giant and common diving petrels, Kerguelen shags, Kerguelen terns, black-faced sheathbills and Eaton's pintails. Antarctic fur seals and southern elephant seals also breed on the shores of the bay.
