= Visale =

Coordinates: 8°36′S 157°20′E

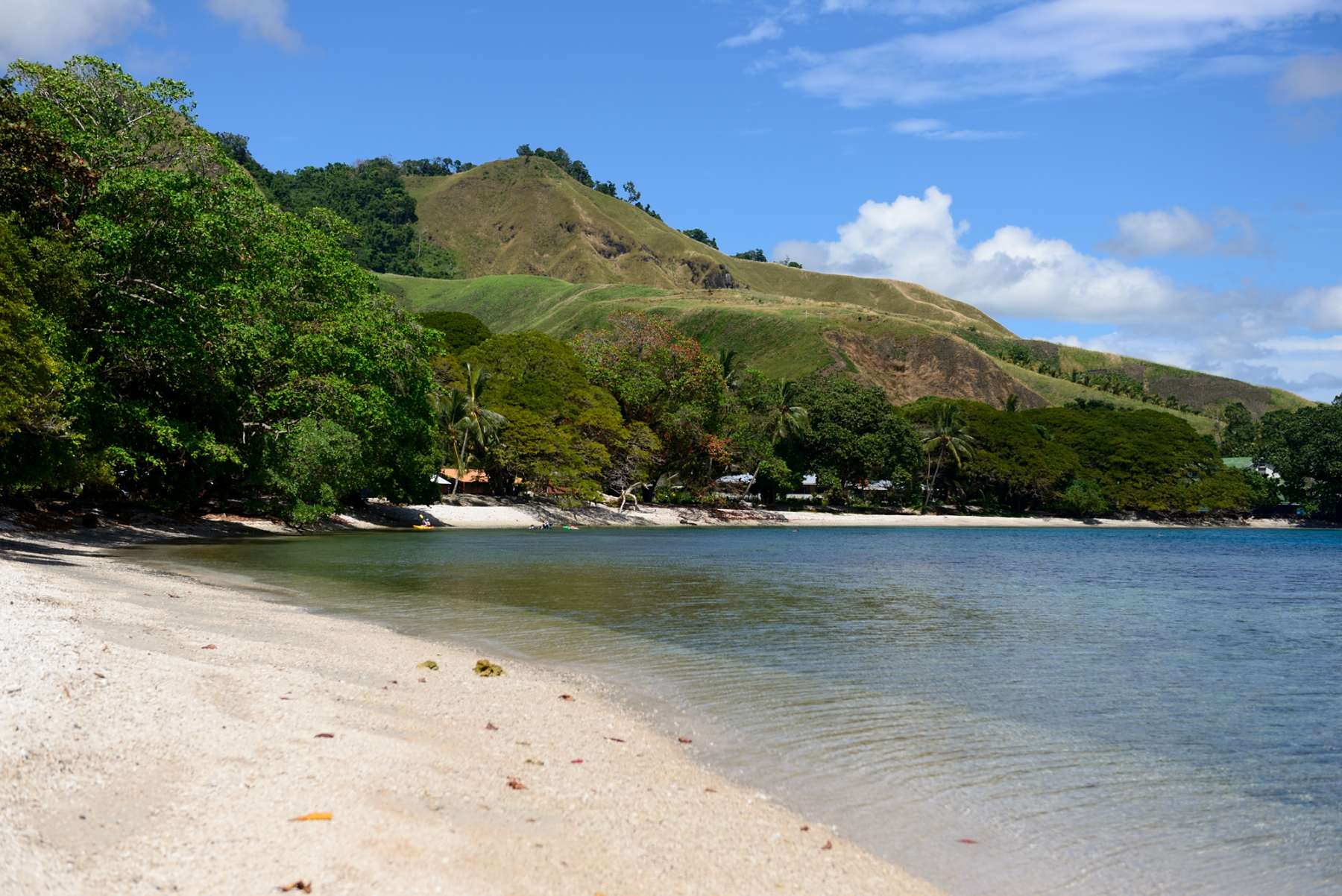
View of Visale beach taken from the eastern side looking west.

Visale is a town in the Solomon Islands. Visale is located in West Guadalcanal. In 2004, the Sacred Heart Parish Church celebrated the 100 years anniversary of Christian faith.
