= Mount Makarakomburu =

Mountain on Guadalcanal, Solomon Islands

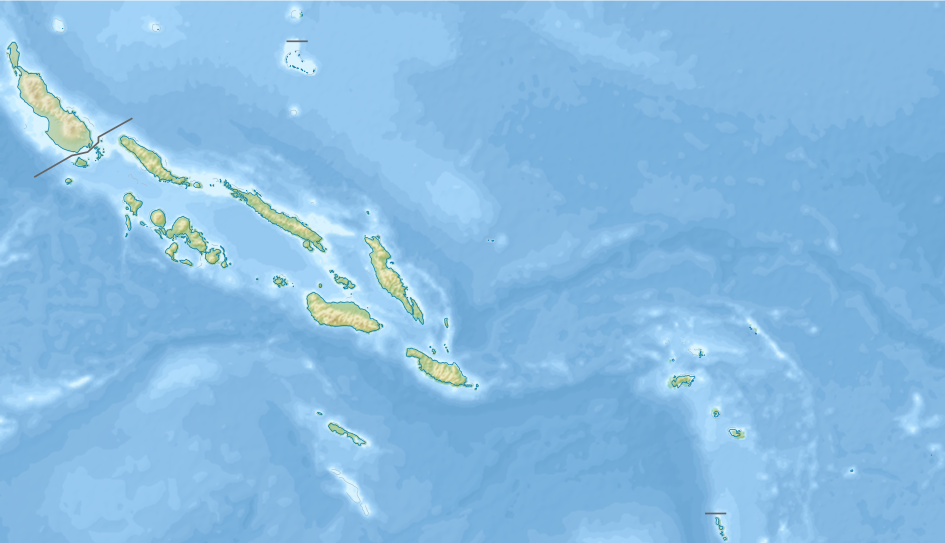
- Location within Solomon Islands

Highest point
- Elevation: 2,310 m (7,580 ft)
- Prominence: 169 m (554 ft)
- Coordinates: 9°44′S 160°02′E

Geography
- Location: Guadalcanal, Solomon Islands

Mount Makarakomburu is the second highest point in the Solomon Islands, located approximately 20 miles south of Honiara, the capital, on the island of Guadalcanal, which is the largest island in the country.

== Elevation ==
SRTM, more accurate IFSAR data, and topographic mapping all agree that the claim by many authorities that Makarakomburu is 2,447 metres (8,028 feet), and the highest point of the Solomon Islands, is incorrect. The highest point of the Solomon Islands is Mount Popomanaseu, 2332m.
