= Guadalcanal =

Principal island of Solomon Islands

Native name: Isatabu (Pijin)
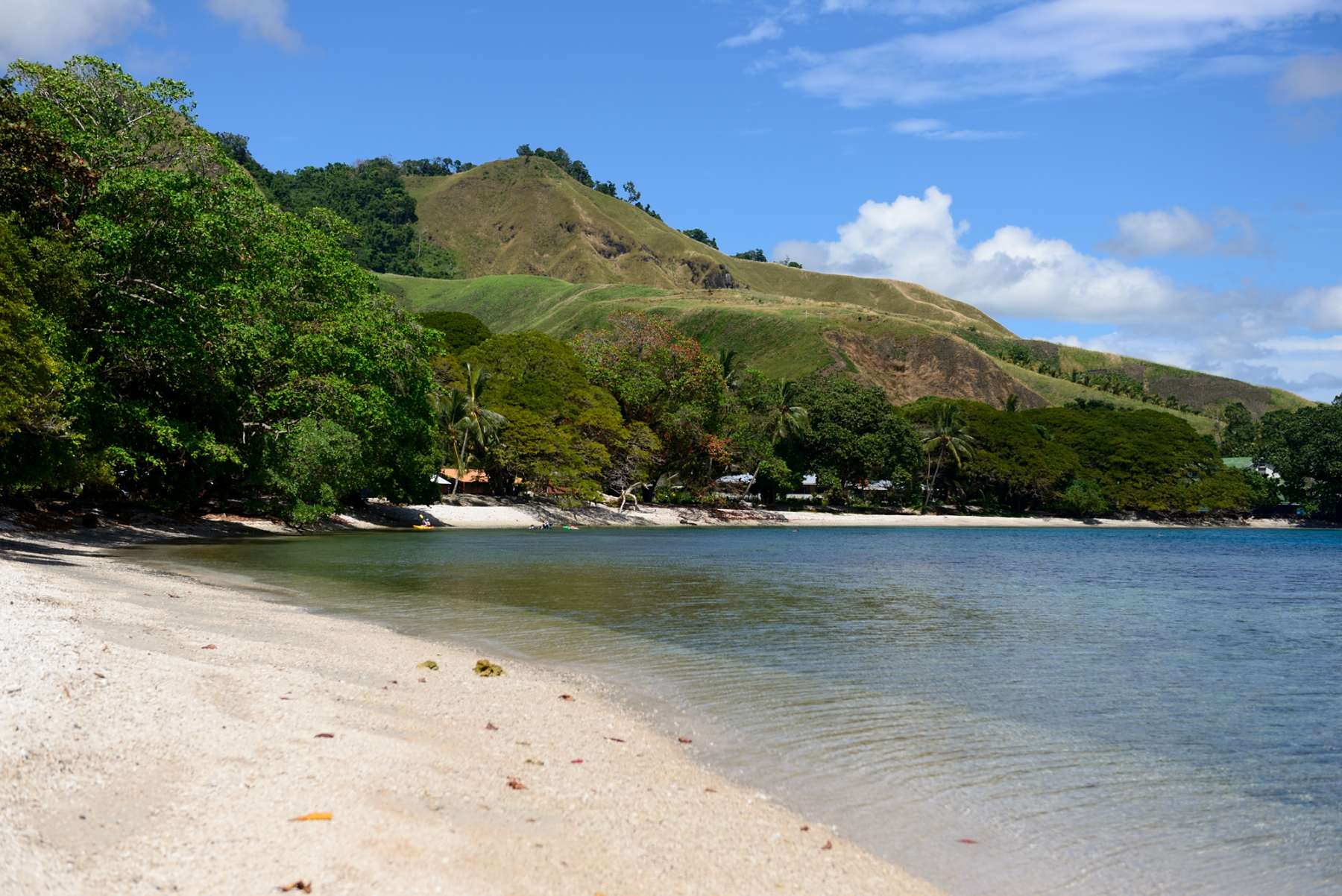
- Beach near Visale

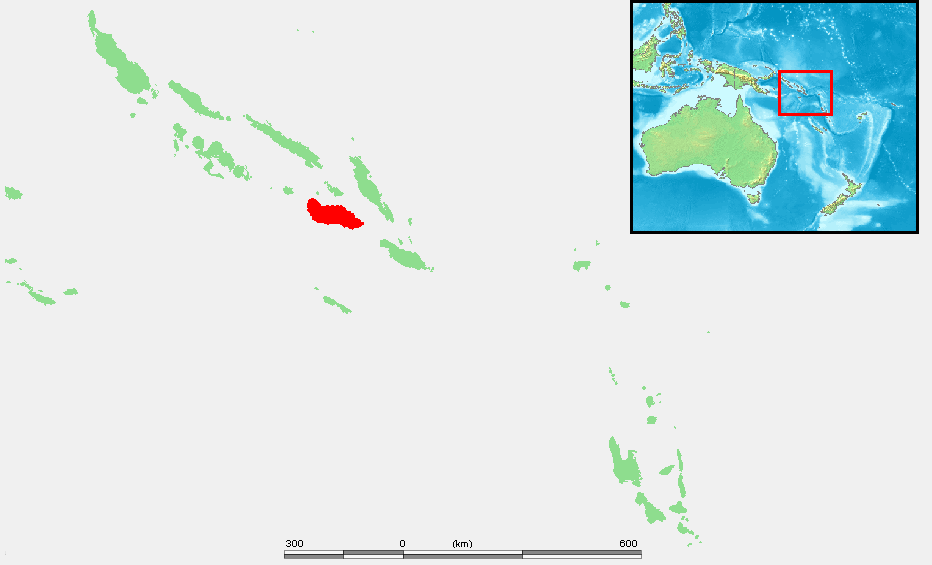

Geography
- Location: Pacific Ocean
- Coordinates: 9°35′24″S 160°14′06″E
- Archipelago: Solomon Islands
- Area: 5,358 km^{2} (2,069 sq mi)
- Highest elevation: 2,335 m (7661 ft)
- Highest point: Mount Popomanaseu

Administration
- Solomon Islands
- Province: Guadalcanal Province
- Largest settlement: Honiara (pop. 129,569 (2019))

Demographics
- Demonym: Guadalcanalese
- Population: 283,591 (2019)
- Pop. density: 52.93/km^{2} (137.09/sq mi)
- Ethnic groups: Melanesian 93%; Polynesian 4%; Micronesian 1.5%; European 0.8%; Chinese 0.3%; others 0.4%

Guadalcanal (/ˌɡwɑːdəlkəˈnæl/; indigenous name: Isatabu) is the principal island in the Guadalcanal Province of Solomon Islands, located in the southwestern Pacific Ocean, northeast of Australia. It is the largest island in the nation of Solomon Islands by both area and population, followed by Malaita. It is the second largest island in the Solomon Islands archipelago by area after Bougainville. The island is mainly covered in dense tropical rainforest and has a mountainous hinterland.

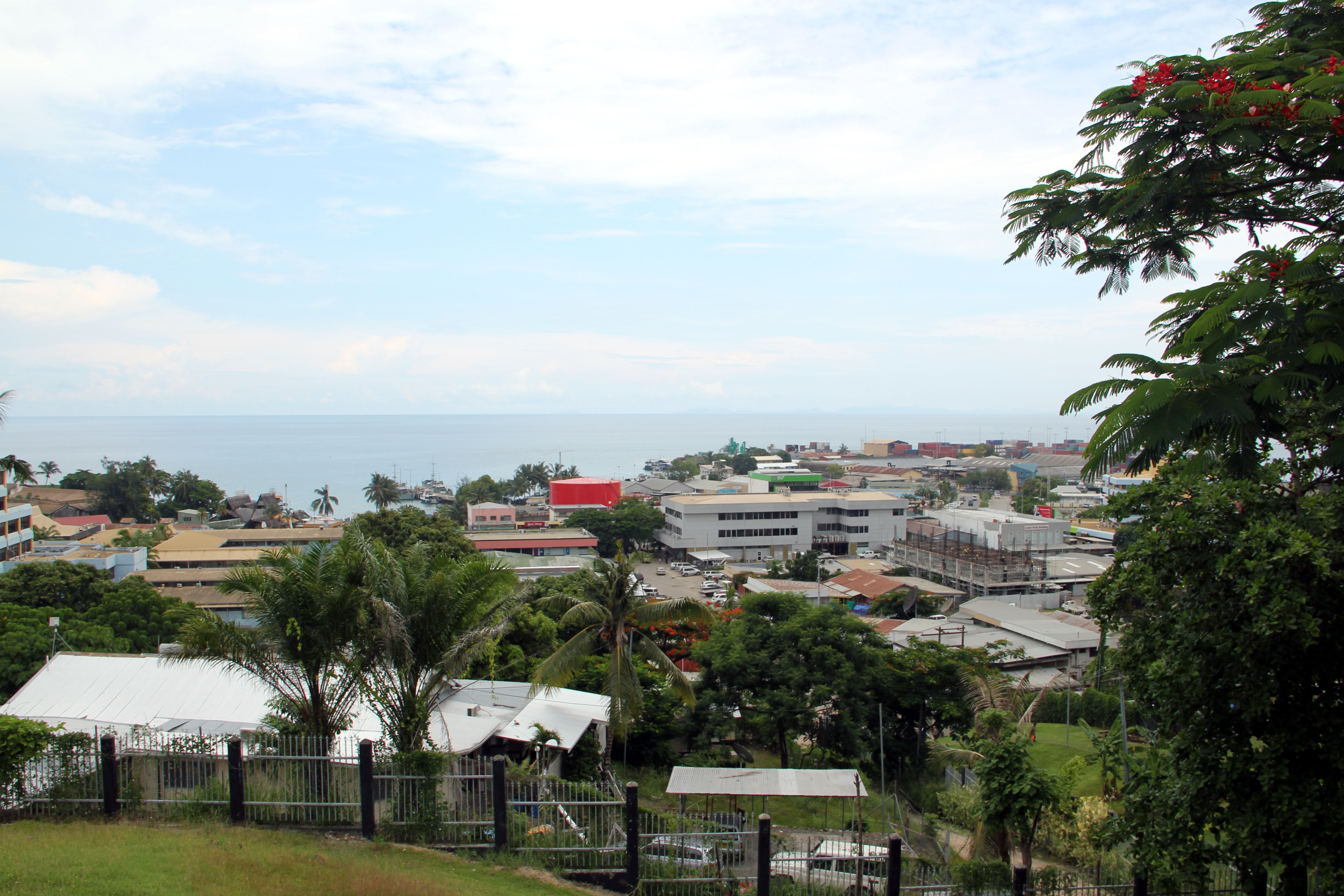
Honiara is the largest city of Guadalcanal and the capital of Solomon Islands.

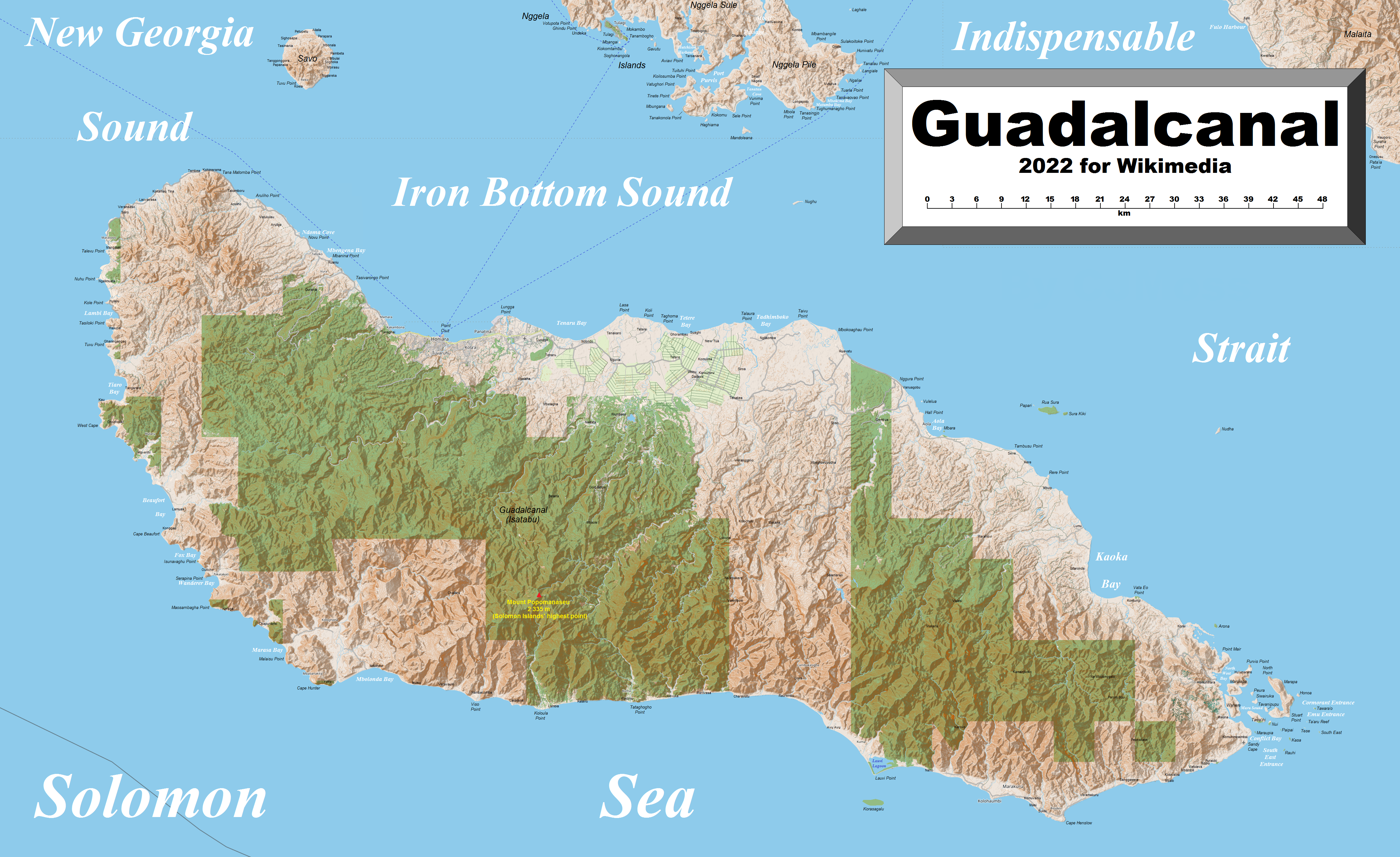
Detailed map of Guadalcanal

Archaeological sites show habitation on the island since 4500–2500 BC. The Austronesian Lapita peoples migrated to the island about 1200-800 BC. Guadalcanal was first charted by Europeans during the Spanish expedition of Álvaro de Mendaña in 1568. The name comes from the village of Guadalcanal, in the province of Seville, in Andalusia, Spain, birthplace of Pedro de Ortega Valencia, a member of Mendaña's expedition.

During 1942 and 1943, it was the scene of the Guadalcanal campaign and saw bitter fighting between Japanese and Allied troops. The Allied troops were ultimately victorious. At the end of World War II, Honiara, on the north coast of Guadalcanal, became the new capital of the British Solomon Islands Protectorate and later the capital of the independent nation of Solomon Islands.

== Geography ==
Guadalcanal is the largest island in Solomon Islands, with a total land area of 5,302 km^{2} (2,047 sq mi), and has a population of 155,605 people, making it the second-most populous island in the country after Malaita. Mount Popomanaseu is the island's highest point and the highest in Solomon Islands, with an elevation of 7,661 ft (2,335 m) above sea level. The Mbokokimbo River is the island's longest river, with a total length of 98.7 km (61.3 mi).

=== Topography ===
List of peaks in Guadalcanal by elevation

- Mount Popomanaseu – 7,661 ft (2,335 m)
- Mount Makarakomburu – 7,580 ft (2,310 m)
- Mount Tanareirei – 6,736 ft (2,053 m)
- Mount Namolava – 6,427 ft (1,959 m)
- Makaratanggoe – 6,339 ft (1,932 m)
- Mount Latinarau – 6,296 ft (1,919 m)
- Mount Kaichui – 6,273 ft (1,912 m)
- Mount Vatuchichi – 6,217 ft (1,895 m)
- Mount Tambunanguu – 6,188 ft (1,886 m)
- Mount Tohasa – 5,719 ft (1,743 m)
- Mount Pinau – 5,669 ft (1,728 m)
- Mount Nasuha – 5,348 ft (1,630 m)
- Mount Tatuve – 5,056 ft (1,541 m)
- Mount Ngalighombe – 4,987 ft (1,520 m)
- Mount Vatupochau – 4,613 ft (1,406 m)
- Mount Kemau – 4,596 ft (1,401 m)
- Mount Vatunjae – 4,491 ft (1,369 m)
- Mount Chaunapaho – 4,449 ft (1,356 m)
- Mount Tingge Tingge – 4,432 ft (1,351 m)
- Chupu Tambu – 4,406 ft (1,343 m)
- Mount Hanihanikaro – 4,262 ft (1,299 m)
- Mount Vatu Horoi – 4,170 ft (1,270 m)
- Lumulumuchichi – 4,150 ft (1,260 m)
- Mount Lambuhila – 4,055 ft (1,236 m)
- Mount Manuchuma – 4,055 ft (1,236 m)
- Mount Vatutora – 4,052 ft (1,235 m)
- Mount Rauramba – 3,930 ft (1,200 m)
- Mount Vausu – 3,783 ft (1,153 m)
- Mount Vuro – 3,681 ft (1,122 m)
- Mount Taluva – 3,451 ft (1,052 m)
- Mount Gallego – 3,415 ft (1,041 m)
- Mount Popori – 3,153 ft (961 m)
- Mount Valivalisi – 3,100 ft (940 m)
- Mount Na Vatu – 2,953 ft (900 m)
- Mount Tughuruloki – 2,621 ft (799 m)
- Mount Mbelapoke – 2,421 ft (738 m)
- Mount Vungana – 2,349 ft (716 m)
- Mount Esperance – 2,008 ft (612 m)

=== River system ===
List of longest rivers by length

- Mbokokimbo River – 98.7 km (61.3 mi)
- Lungga River – 80.4 km (50.0 mi)
- Mbalisuna River – 76.6 km (47.6 mi)
- Mberande River – 75.5 km (46.9 mi)
- Mongga River – 59.8 km (37.2 mi)
- Itina River – 48.6 km (30.2 mi)
- Aola River – 47.6 km (29.6 mi)
- Simiu River – 46 km (29 mi)
- Rere River – 43.2 km (26.8 mi)
- Kombito River – 33.1 km (20.6 mi)
- Matanikau River – 20.5 km (12.7 mi)
- Koloula River – 17.2 km (10.7 mi)

== History ==
=== Early history ===
The island has been settled since at least 4500–2500 BC based on archaeological finds at Poha Cave and Vatuluma Posovi. During the period 1200-800 BC, Austronesian Lapita peoples settled the islands.

A Spanish expedition from Peru in 1568 under the command of Álvaro de Mendaña de Neira were the first Europeans to see the island. Mendaña's subordinate, Pedro de Ortega Valencia, named the island after his home town Guadalcanal in Andalusia, Spain. In the years that followed the discovery, the island was variously referred to as Guadarcana, Guarcana, Guadalcana, and Guadalcanar, which reflected different pronunciations of its name in Andalusian Spanish.

European settlers, whalers, and missionaries began to arrive in the 18th and 19th centuries. With these outsiders also arrived foreign institutions such as forced labour. Beginning during the 1860s, about 60,000 natives from many parts of the Solomon Islands were indentured and sent to Australia or Fiji by British authorities to work on plantations. This system continued into the 1890s. In the 1880s, the Germans and the British vied for control of the Solomons. Germany established a protectorate over the northern Solomons in 1884, while in 1893, the British Solomon Islands Protectorate was proclaimed, which included the island of Guadalcanal. Germany eventually handed over most of their protectorate to Britain, though, in 1899. By the early 20th century, large agricultural plantations (specialising in copra), run mainly by Australians, were established in the region. Guadalcanal was not seriously affected by World War I. In 1932, the British confirmed the name Guadalcanal in line with the town in Andalusia, Spain.

=== Second World War ===
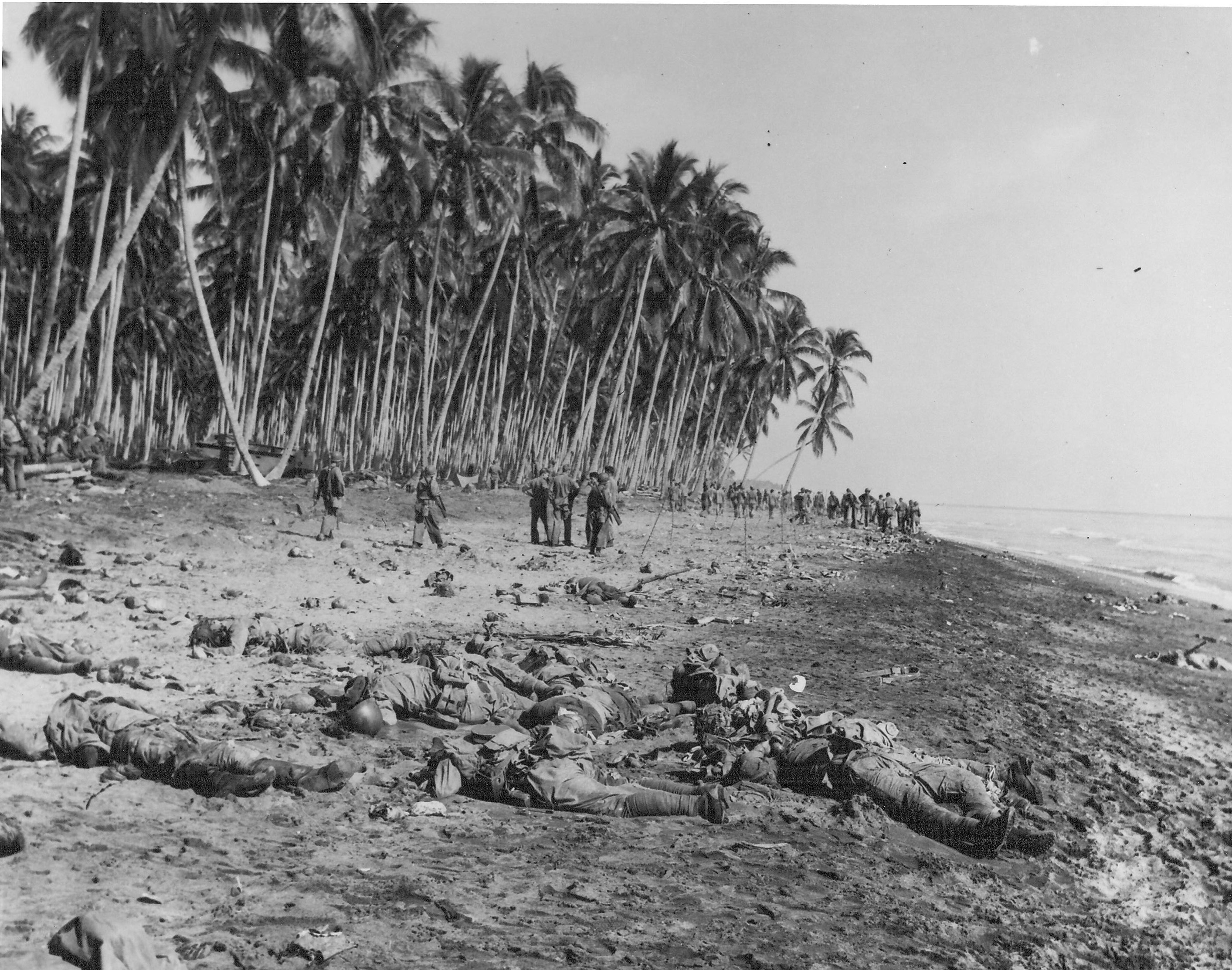
Japanese soldiers, killed while assaulting US Marine positions at the mouth of Alligator Creek

In the months following the attack on Pearl Harbor in December 1941, the Japanese drove the Americans out of the Philippines, the British out of British Malaya, and the Dutch out of the East Indies. The Japanese then began to expand into the western Pacific, occupying many islands in an attempt to build a defensive ring around their conquests and threaten the lines of communication from the United States to Australia and New Zealand. The Japanese reached Guadalcanal in May 1942.

When an American reconnaissance mission spotted construction of a Japanese airfield at Lunga Point on the north coast of Guadalcanal, the situation became critical. This new Japanese airfield represented a threat to Australia, so as a matter of urgency, despite not being adequately prepared, the United States conducted its first amphibious landing of the war on Guadalcanal. The initial landings of the 1st Marine Division on 7 August 1942 secured the airfield with little difficulty, but holding the airfield for the next six months against combined Japanese ground assault, air attack and naval bombardment was one of the most hotly contested campaigns in the entire Pacific theatre of war.

Immediately after landing on the island, U.S. Navy Seabees began finishing the airfield begun by the Japanese. It was then named Henderson Field after a Marine aviator killed in combat during the Battle of Midway. Aircraft operating from Henderson Field during the campaign were a mix of U.S. Marine, Army, Navy, and other Allied aircraft that became known as the Cactus Air Force. They defended the airfield and threatened any Japanese ships that ventured too close to the island during daylight hours. At night, however, Japanese naval forces were frequently able to shell the airfield and deliver troops with supplies, retiring before daylight. The Japanese used fast ships, namely destroyers, to conduct this reinforcement and supply effort, which became known as the Tokyo Express. So many ships from both sides were sunk in the many naval engagements in and around the Solomon Island chain that the nearby waters came to be referred to as Ironbottom Sound.

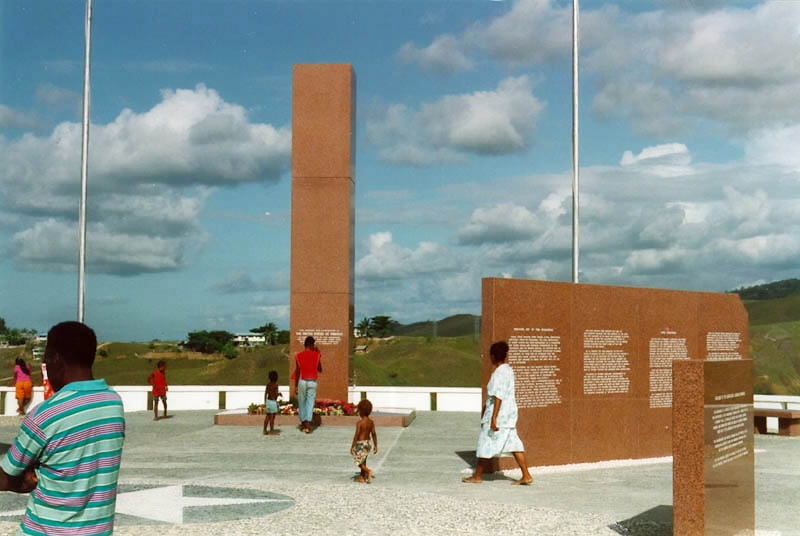
Guadalcanal American Memorial

The naval Battle of Cape Esperance was fought on 11 October 1942 in the waters off the northwest coast of Guadalcanal. During the engagement, the United States Navy intercepted and defeated a Japanese formation of ships on their way down "the Slot" to reinforce and resupply troops on the island, suffering losses of their own in the process. The multi-day Naval Battle of Guadalcanal in early November marked a critical turning point in the campaign. Allied naval forces engaged a large, experienced Japanese surface force at night and forced it to withdraw. Notably, the USS Washington sank the Japanese battleship Kirishima, becoming the first of only two occasions in the Pacific theatre that two battleships engaged each other in combat, the second being in 1944 during the Battle of Leyte Gulf. Some Japanese viewpoints consider these naval engagements, which showcased the improving capability of Allied warships to challenge the Imperial Japanese Navy's significant advantage in night-fighting techniques, to be just as significant as the Battle of Midway in turning the tide against them.

After six months of hard combat in and around Guadalcanal, the Japanese forces on the island were critically undersupplied and no longer combat effective, while Allied troops were steadily increasing in quantity and quality. Remaining Japanese forces on the island were evacuated at Cape Esperance on the northwest coast in February 1943. American authorities declared Guadalcanal secure on 9 February 1943. The Guadalcanal campaign was a major turning point in the war, as it stopped further Japanese expansion.

Two U.S. Navy ships have been named for the campaign:

- USS Guadalcanal (CVE-60) was a World War II escort carrier.
- USS Guadalcanal (LPH-7) was an amphibious assault ship.

To date, the only U.S. Coast Guardsman recipient of the Medal of Honor is Signalman 1st Class Douglas Albert Munro, awarded posthumously for his extraordinary heroism on 27 September 1942 at Point Cruz. Munro provided covering fire and helped evacuate 500 besieged Marines from a beach at Point Cruz; he was killed during the evacuation. During the Battle for Henderson Field, the Medal of Honor was also awarded to John Basilone, who was later killed in action during the Battle of Iwo Jima in 1945.

After the war, American and Japanese groups repeatedly visited Guadalcanal to search for the remains of missing soldiers. The bodies of some 7,000 Japanese troops remain missing on the island, and bones of Japanese soldiers have been unearthed into the 2010s.

=== Postwar years ===
Immediately after the Second World War, the capital of the British Solomon Islands Protectorate was moved to Honiara on Guadalcanal from its previous location at Tulagi in what were then the Florida Islands, now the Nggela Islands. In 1952, the high commissioner for the Western Pacific moved from Fiji to Honiara, and the post was combined with that of the governor of the Solomon Islands Protectorate. The secondary airfield, known as "Fighter Two", is now the local golf course. On independence in 1978, the British Solomon Islands Protectorate became the nation of Solomon Islands, with its capital established in Honiara, Guadalcanal. The airfield long known as Henderson Field that caused the fighting in 1942 sits about eight kilometres east of Honiara and became the Honiara International Airport.

=== Civil war ===
In early 1999, long-simmering tensions between the local Guale people on Guadalcanal and more recent migrants from the neighbouring island of Malaita erupted into violence. The Guadalcanal Revolutionary Army, later called Isatabu Freedom Movement, began terrorising Malaitans in the rural areas of the island in an effort to force them out of their homes. About 20,000 Malaitans fled to the capital, and others returned to their home island; Guale residents of Honiara fled. The city became a Malaitan enclave and the Malaita Eagle Force took over government. The Royal Australian Navy and Royal New Zealand Navy deployed vessels to the area to protect the expatriate community resident mostly in Honiara. In 2003, the Pacific Forum negotiated the intervention of RAMSI or Operation Helpem Fren involving Australia, New Zealand, and other Pacific island nations.

== Vilu War Museum ==
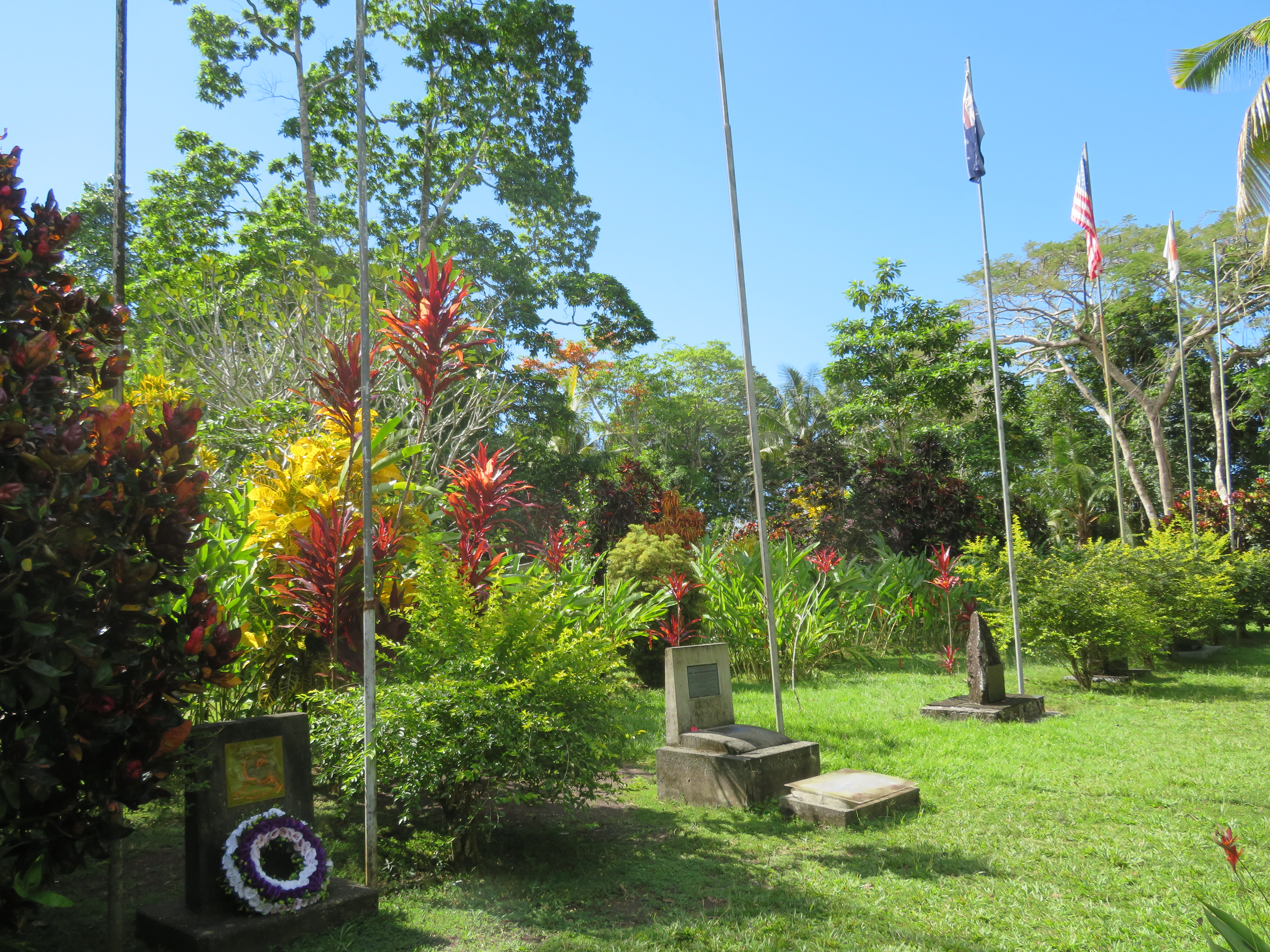
Memorials in Vilu War Museum

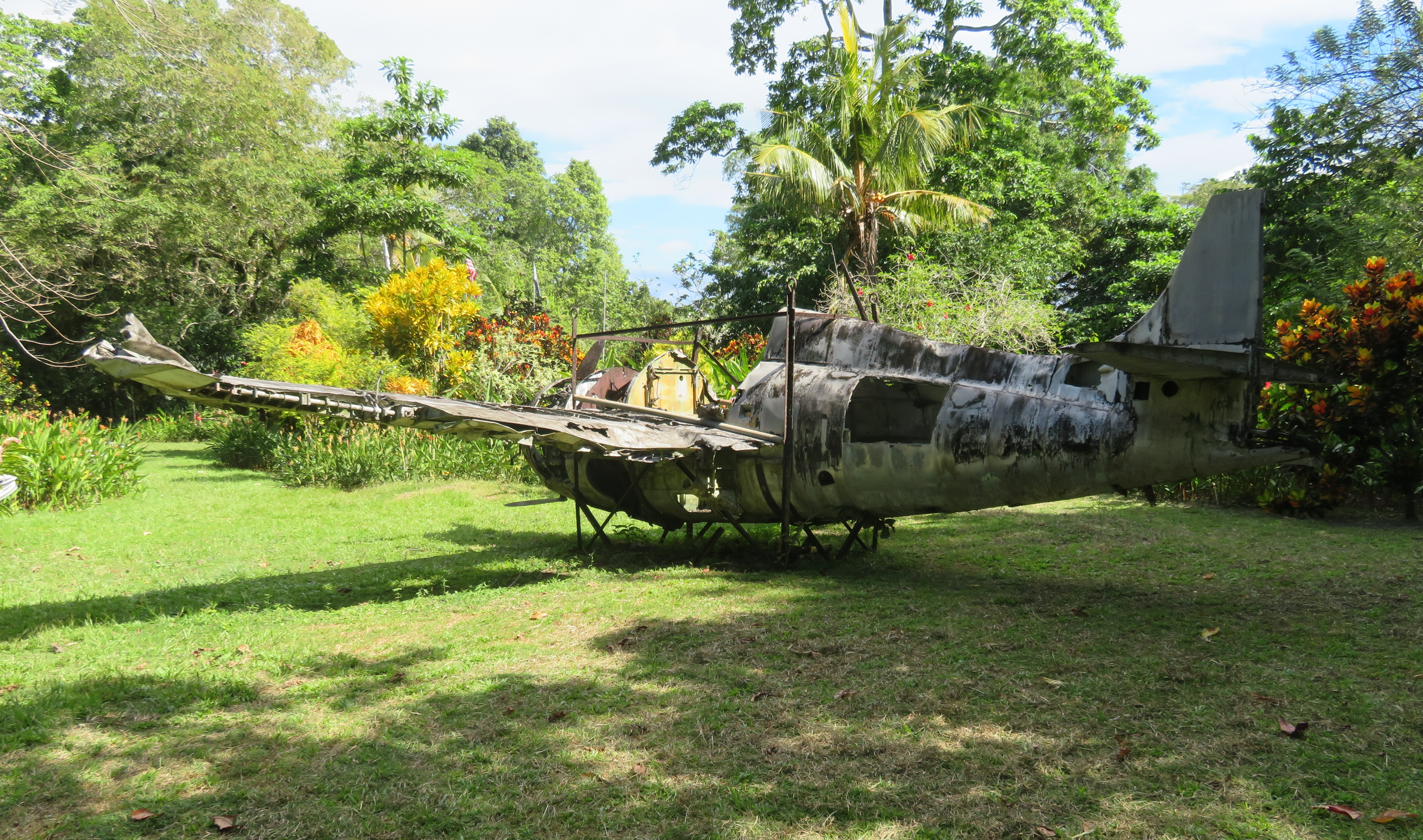
Aircraft in Vilu War Museum

About 25 km (15 mi) from Honiara to the west, Vilu War Museum houses an outdoor collection of remains of various parts of military equipment and of several aircraft. Several memorials for the American, Australian, Fijian, New Zealand, and Japanese soldiers who died were erected, as well.

== Fauna ==
The island hosts a native marsupial known as the phalanger or grey cuscus, Phalanger orientalis. The only other mammals are bats and rodents.

Many species of colourful parrots are found there, and estuarine crocodiles inhabit the island's shores. In recent times, these crocodiles have been found only on the Weather Coast in the south of the island, but during World War II, they were found along the north coast in the vicinity of the airstrip where the fighting was taking place, as evidenced by names such as Alligator Creek.

Venomous snakes are rare on the island and are not considered to be a serious threat, but a kind of centipede there has a particularly nasty bite. The Guadalcanal Watersheds form a site that has been identified by BirdLife International as an important bird area, because it supports populations of threatened or endemic bird species. At 376,146 ha (1,452 sq mi), it covers some 70% of the island, extending along the southern coast inland to the central highlands, and contains riverine and lowland tropical rainforest, as well as the greatest contiguous area of cloud forest in the Solomons. Although it also contains gardens and old village sites, most of it has never been permanently inhabited. Significant birds for which the site was identified include chestnut-bellied imperial pigeons, Woodford's rails, Guadalcanal moustached kingfishers, Meek's lorikeets, Guadalcanal honeyeaters, Guadalcanal thicketbirds, and Guadalcanal thrushes. Potential threats to the site include logging and invasive species.
