= Ultra-prominent peak =

Mountain with prominence of 1,500 metres

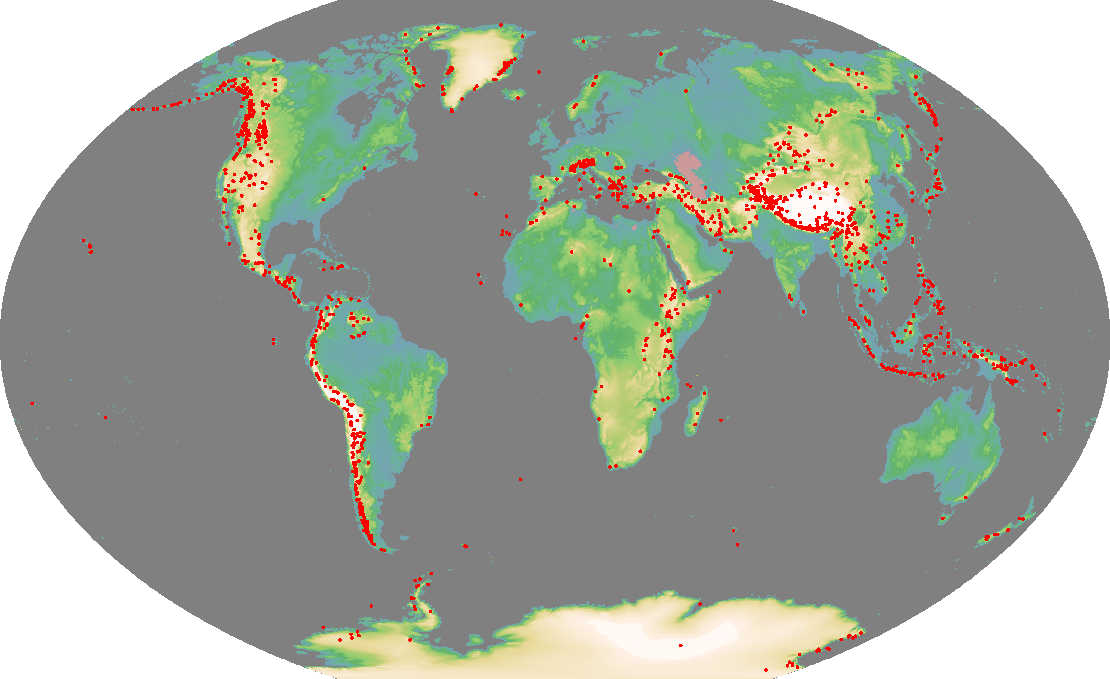
Map of ultras worldwide

An ultra-prominent peak, or ultra for short, is a mountain summit with a topographic prominence of 1,500 metres (4,900 ft) or more; it is also called a P1500. The prominence of a peak is the minimum height of climb to the summit on any route from a higher peak, or from sea level if there is no higher peak. There are about 1,500 such peaks on Earth. Some well-known peaks, such as the Matterhorn and Eiger, are not ultras because they are connected to higher mountains by high cols and thus do not achieve enough topographic prominence.

The term "ultra” derives from "ultra major mountain,” a term proposed by earth scientist Stephen Fry, who studied peaks in Washington in the 1980s.

== Distribution ==
More than 1,500 ultras have been identified above sea level: 654 in Asia, 357 in North America, 209 in South America, 119 in Europe (including 12 in the Caucasus), 84 in Africa, 54 in Oceania, and 39 in Antarctica.

Many of the world's largest mountains are ultras, including Mount Everest, K2, Kanchenjunga, Kilimanjaro, Mont Blanc, and Mount Olympus. On the other hand, others such as the Eiger and the Matterhorn are not ultras. Many ultras lie in rarely visited and inhospitable parts of the world, including 39 in Greenland, the high points of the Arctic islands of Novaya Zemlya, Jan Mayen and Spitsbergen, and many of the peaks of the Greater ranges of Asia. In British Columbia, some of the mountains listed do not even have generally recognized names.

Thirteen of the fourteen 8,000-metre summits are ultras (the exception being Lhotse), and there are a further 64 ultras over 7,000 metres (23,000 ft) in height. There are 90 ultras with a prominence of over 3,000 metres (9,800 ft), but only 22 with more than 4,000 metres (13,000 ft) prominence.

A number of ultras have yet to be climbed. Sauyr Zhotasy, (possibly) Mount Siple, and Gangkar Puensum are the most likely candidates for the most prominent unclimbed mountain in the world.

All of the Seven Summits are ultras by virtue of the fact that they are the high points of large landmasses. Each has its key col at or near sea level, resulting in a prominence value almost equal to its elevation.

== Lists of ultras (1,516 total) ==
Some peaks straddle political boundaries, making the totals of sub-categories greater than expected. For example, the seven ultras on the Canada-US border are counted in both lists.

=== General ===
- List of islands by highest point, 115 of which are ultras.
- List of mountain peaks by prominence gives the 125 most prominent peaks worldwide.

=== Africa (84) ===
- List of ultras of Africa (84)

=== Antarctica (41) ===
- List of ultras of Antarctica, including South Atlantic islands (41)

=== Asia (635) ===
- List of ultras of Central Asia (75)
- List of ultras of Japan (21)
- List of ultras of Northeast Asia (51)
- List of ultras of Southeast Asia (42)
- List of ultras of the Himalayas, including Sino-Nepal Provinces (76)
- List of ultras of the Karakoram and Hindu Kush (61)
- List of ultras of the Malay Archipelago (91, including 12 in Oceania [Papua])
- List of ultras of the Philippines (29)
- List of ultras of Tibet, East Asia and neighbouring areas, including India (112)
- List of ultras of West Asia (88)

=== Europe (120) ===
- List of European ultra-prominent peaks (120)
  - List of Alpine peaks by prominence (44)

=== North America (356) ===
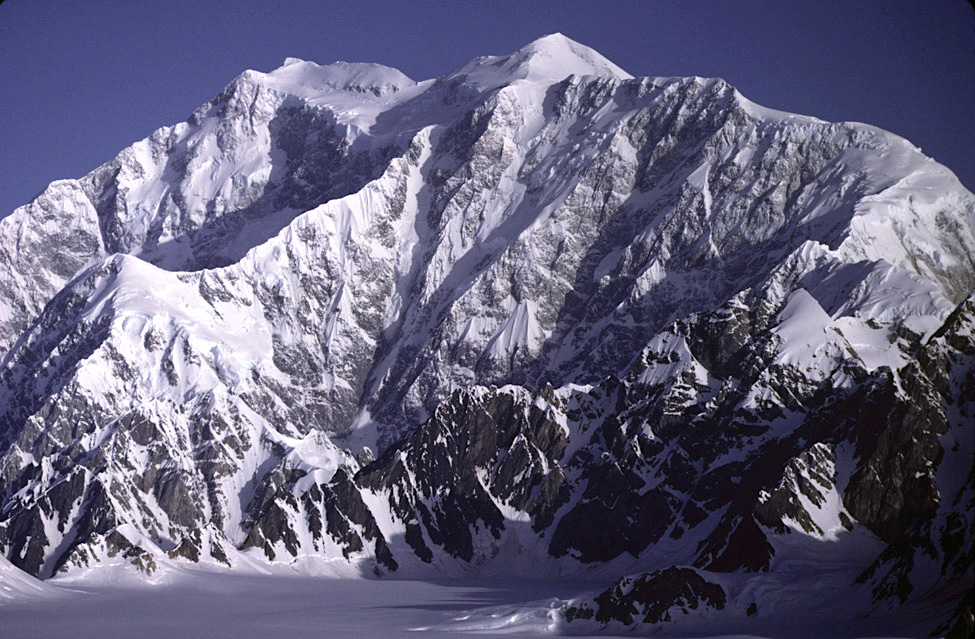
The summit of Mount Logan in Yukon, the highest point in Canada, is ranked sixth in the world by topographic prominence.

- List of ultras of North America (356)
  - List of the most prominent summits of Canada (143)
  - List of the most prominent summits of the United States (129)
    - List of ultras in Alaska (65)
  - List of ultras of Central America (23)
  - List of ultras of Greenland (39)
  - List of ultras of Mexico (27)
  - List of ultras of the Caribbean (7)

=== Oceania (69) ===
- List of ultras of Oceania, including the southern Indian Ocean (69)
  - List of ultras of Australia (2)
  - List of ultras of New Zealand (10)
  - List of ultras of Papua New Guinea (31)
  - List of ultras of the Hawaiian Islands (6)
  - List of ultras of the Pacific Islands (6)
  - List of ultras of the southern Indian Ocean (2)
  - List of ultras of Western New Guinea (Indonesia) (12)

=== South America (209) ===
- List of ultras of South America (209)

== See also ==
- List of mountain lists
- List of mountain peaks by prominence
- Topographic prominence
