= Tromelin =

Tromelin may refer to:

== Places ==
- Tromelin Island, an island in the Indian Ocean

== People ==
- Bernard-Marie Boudin de Tromelin (1735–1815), French Navy officer
- Maurice Boudin de Tromelin de Launay (1740–1825), French Navy officer
- Jacques Marie Boudin de Tromelin de La Nuguy (1751–1798), French Navy officer
- Jacques Boudin de Tromelin (1770–1842), French Brigade general of the First French Empire
