= Cyclone Honorinina =

South-West Indian tropical cyclone in 1986

Tropical Cyclone Honorinina
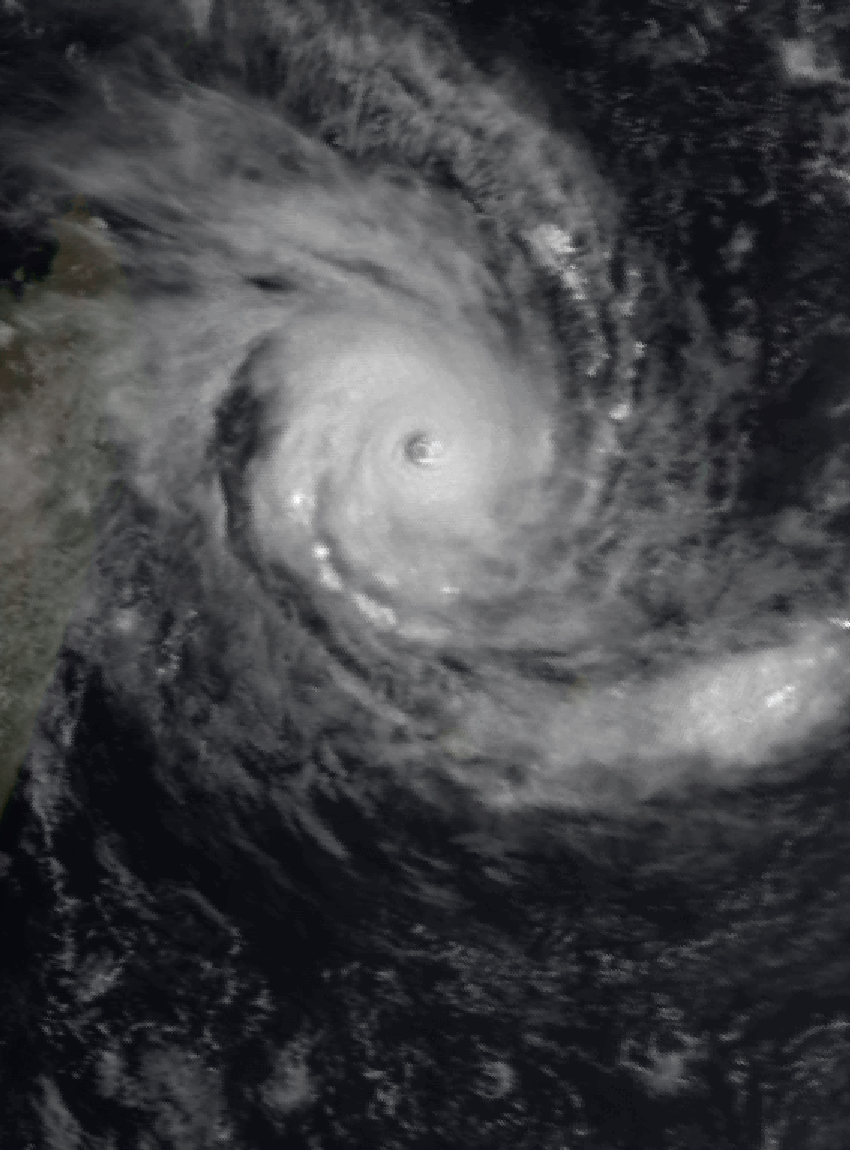
- Cyclone Honorinina nearing Madagascar

Meteorological history
- Formed: 9 March 1986
- Extratropical: 18 March 1986
- Dissipated: 23 March 1986

Tropical cyclone
- 10-minute sustained (MFR)
- Highest winds: 150 km/h (95 mph)
- Lowest pressure: 941 hPa (mbar); 27.79 inHg

Category 3-equivalent tropical cyclone
- 1-minute sustained (SSHWS/JTWC)
- Highest winds: 205 km/h (125 mph)

Overall effects
- Fatalities: 99 total
- Damage: $150 million (1987 USD)
- Areas affected: St. Brandon, Tromelin Island, Madagascar
- IBTrACS
- Part of the 1985–86 South-West Indian Ocean cyclone season

Tropical Cyclone Honorinina was a powerful tropical cyclone that struck eastern Madagascar in March 1986. The eighth named storm of the season, Honorinina formed on 9 March to the south of Diego Garcia. It moved generally to the west-southwest due to a ridge to the south, gradually intensifying. On 12 March, the Météo France office in Réunion (MFR) upgraded Honorinina to tropical cyclone status, which is the equivalent of a minimal hurricane. On the next day, the cyclone attained maximum sustained winds of 150 km/h (93 mph) while in the vicinity of Tromelin Island. Honorinina weakened subsequently before making landfall about 40 km (25 mi) north of Toamasina, Madagascar with winds of 135 km/h (84 mph). The storm weakened further over land, moving southwestward across the country. It emerged into the Mozambique Channel and became extratropical on 18 March. Honorinina then turned to the southeast, dissipating on 23 March.

Early in its duration, the storm produced gusty winds along St. Brandon, and it later brought gusts of 158 km/h (98 mph) on Tromelin Island. However, effects were worst in Madagascar, especially in Toamasina near where the storm made landfall. Damage spread along 800 km (500 mi) of the coastline and spread 100 km (62 mi) inland from the landfall point, with many towns severely affected. In Toamasina, the cyclone damaged the main port, the airport, and several warehouses, resulting in $17 million (1986 USD) of lost inventory. Thousands of houses were damaged, leaving 83,885 people homeless; a housing program earlier set up after Cyclone Kamisy in 1984 was extended to help storm victims after Honorinina. Nationwide, the cyclone killed 99 people and caused $150 million (1986 USD) in damage.

== Meteorological history ==
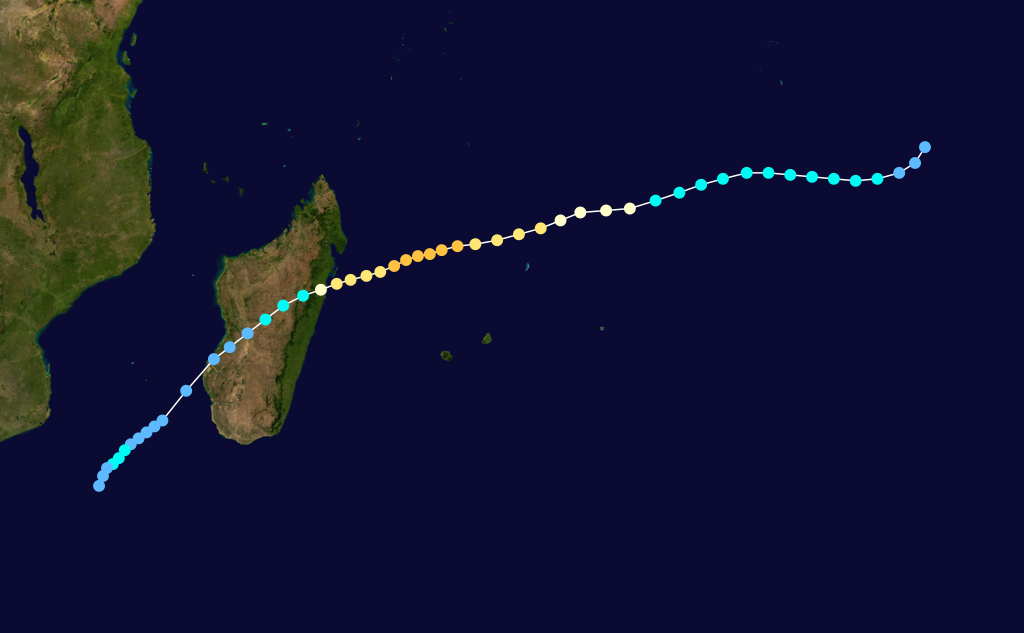
Map plotting the storm's track and intensity, according to the Saffir–Simpson scale Map key Saffir–Simpson scale Tropical depression (≤38 mph, ≤62 km/h) Tropical storm (39–73 mph, 63–118 km/h) Category 1 (74–95 mph, 119–153 km/h) Category 2 (96–110 mph, 154–177 km/h) Category 3 (111–129 mph, 178–208 km/h) Category 4 (130–156 mph, 209–251 km/h) Category 5 (≥157 mph, ≥252 km/h) Unknown Storm type Tropical cyclone Subtropical cyclone Extratropical cyclone, remnant low, tropical disturbance, or monsoon depression

On 8 March, a circulation was observed southeast of Diego Garcia and was undergoing tropical cyclogenesis. By the next day, satellite imagery indicated that a tropical storm had formed about 635 km (395 mi) south of the island, given the name Honorinina. On 9 March, the Météo France office in Réunion (MFR) (Note: The Météo-France office in Réunion is the official Regional Specialized Meteorological Center for the basin.) began tracking the storm in its database, and the Joint Typhoon Warning Center (JTWC) (Note: The Joint Typhoon Warning Center is a joint United States Navy – United States Air Force task force that issues tropical cyclone warnings for the region.) began classifying it as Tropical Cyclone 25S. The nascent tropical storm moved generally to the west-southwest, gradually intensifying. On 11 March, the JTWC upgraded Honorinina to the equivalent of a minimal hurricane with 1 minute maximum sustained winds of 120 km/h (75 mph). (Note: Wind estimates from Météo-France and most other basins throughout the world are sustained over 10 minutes, while estimates from the United States-based Joint Typhoon Warning Center are sustained over 1 minute. 10 minute winds are about 1.14 times the amount of 1 minute winds.) On the next day, the MFR followed suit by upgrading the storm to tropical cyclone status while it was passing 175 km (109 mi) north of St. Brandon island.

After a trough passed eastward, a ridge developed south of Honorinina, which reinforced the southwest track toward Madagascar. On 13 March, the MFR estimated the cyclone attained peak 10 minute winds of 150 km/h (93 mph), while the JTWC estimated peak 1 minute winds of 205 km/h (127 mph). The MFR also estimated the storm was producing gusts of 228 km/h (142 mph). While near peak intensity, Honorinina passed about 25 km (15 mph) south of Tromelin Island, and subsequently gradually weakened. On 15 March, the cyclone made landfall on eastern Madagascar about 40 km (25 mi) north of Toamasina. Winds at landfall were estimated at 135 km/h (84 mph), and a barometric pressure of 971.2 mbar (28.68 inHg) was reported at Toamasina. It rapidly weakened to tropical depression status over land, and the JTWC discontinued advisories on 16 March. The circulation continued southwestward through the island, emerging into the Mozambique Channel on the next day. Thereafter, Honorinina restrengthened slightly over open waters. However, the MFR declared the storm as extratropical on 18 March, based on the satellite appearance. The JTWC again issued advisories on the next day, only to discontinue them on 20 March. Meanwhile, the MFR tracked the cyclone as turning to the south and southeast well south of Madagascar. On 22 March, Honorinina turned back to the south and dissipated the following day within the westerlies.

== Impact and aftermath ==
Early in its duration, Honorinina passed near St. Brandon, where wind gusts reached 100 km/h (62 mph). Later, the storm produced wind gusts of 158 km/h (98 mph) on Tromelin Island. The barometric pressure there fell to 972 mbar (28.7 inHg) during the storm's passage.

Before moving ashore mainland Madagascar, the cyclone brushed Île Sainte-Marie with gusts of 200 km/h (120 mph) while also dropping 270 mm (11 in) of rainfall over 24 hours. On mainland Madagascar, damage was heaviest at the port city of Toamasina, where winds also gusted to 200 km/h (120 mph), and rainfall totaled 455.5 mm (17.93 in) over 24 hours. Heavy rainfall spread across the island, reaching 180.4 mm (7.10 in) at Morondava along the west coast. Damage spread along 800 km (500 mi) of the coastline and spread 100 km (62 mi) inland from the landfall point, with many towns severely affected. Damage was heaviest in Toamasina, where the cyclone's winds struck for 30 hours. High waves broke off a 50 m (160 ft) section of the port jetty, leaving it susceptible to future storms. The tides also washed away shipping containers and flooded a coastal road. The damaged port warehouses resulted in the loss of 4000 tons of rice and 990 tons of stored cloves and cotton, as well as 1,900 tons of coffee. Collectively, the lost stored product totaled around $17 million (1986 USD). Also in Toamasina, the cyclone damaged navigational systems, forcing the airport to close to all but light aircraft.

Outside of Toamasina, Honorinina damaged roads and rail lines connecting the city with the capital, Antananarivo. Several other roads were damaged by landslides or washouts, and many bridges were damaged. The high winds damaged or destroyed thousands of homes along the storm's path, leaving 83,885 people homeless. Many of the damaged homes lost their roofs, which resulted in additional damage when the heavy rainfall affected their interiors. The high winds also damaged many public buildings and factories along its path. The cyclone left widespread areas without water or power; the storm damaged electrical transmission and generation facilities. The high rainfall damaged dykes in Andromba and along the Ikopa and Sisaony rivers. Across the country, Honorinina killed 99 people, and caused 424 injuries. Damage totaled about $150 million (1986 USD).

On March 20, the government of Madagascar appealed to the international community for assistance, due to the heavy damage from the cyclone. In response to the request, various governments and international organizations provided assistance to Madagascar, including $490,000 from the European Economic Community for food and blankets, as well as $125,000 from UNICEF for medicine and building supplies. Catholic Relief Services donated clothing, rice, and milk from Caritas Madagascar. Countries that provided assistance included China, France, the United Kingdom, the United States, West Germany, Holy See, Mauritius, Canada, Finland, New Zealand, Norway, Sweden, Soviet Union, and Switzerland. Collectively, the international community provided $3.37 million worth of aid to Madagascar. The United States Pacific Command flew from the Philippines to Madagascar to deliver medicine. The nation had earlier helped Madagascar recover from Cyclone Kamisy in 1984 with housing rebuilding projects, and transferred materials due to the impacts from Honorinina to the Toamasina area. The Malagasy government also set up a National Relief Committee to facilitate relief efforts, including an initial inspection of the affected area to determine needs. Workers delivered about 19 tons of material to Toamasina and nearby Brickaville, including milk, blankets, and clothing. The World Bank estimated the cost for repairing commercial areas would be over $27 million (1986 USD). The agency also allocated funds toward repairing damaged power facilities, ports, roads, and airports. The International Monetary Fund also approved a $37.8 million loan to the country in 1986, half of which for emergency aid. Many houses and buildings had to be closed for repairs due to flood damage, including hotels, churches, and schools.

== See also ==
- Cyclone Geralda – powerful cyclone in 1994 that took a similar track, killing 231 people
- Cyclone Gafilo – powerful cyclone in 2004 that took a similar track, killing 237 people
- Cyclone Batsirai – powerful cyclone in 2022 that took a similar track, killing 123 people
