= French corvette Dauphine (1773) =

History

France
- Name: Dauphine
- Builder: Ile Bourbon (La Réunion)
- Laid down: circa 1772
- Launched: June 1773
- In service: August 1773

General characteristics
- Propulsion: Sail
- Armament: In 1780; 4 × 3-pounder guns; 12 swivel guns

Dauphine was a small 4-gun corvette of the French Navy. She is notable for the rescue operation to Tromelin Island that gave it its present name, and for taking part in the Second voyage of Kerguelen. The Baie de la Dauphine, in the Kerguelen Archipelago, is named in her honour.

== Career ==
Dauphine was launched in June 1773 at Ile Bourbon and commissioned under Ferron du Quengo. She was part of a squadron under Kerguelen-Trémarec, also comprising the 64-gun Roland and the 32-gun frigate Oiseau, under Captain de Saulx de Rosnevet. The squadron left Ile Bourbon on 19 October 1773 for Kerguelen's second expedition in search of the fabled Terra Australis.

On 16 December, Dauphine discovered Îles Nuageuses. On 6 January, the squadron arrived at Baie de l'Oiseau and Ensign Rochegude left a message claiming the Kerguelen Islands for France. The Baie de la Dauphine is named for her. Dauphine, Gros Ventre and Oiseau returned to Madagascar, calling Antongil Bay. On 9 March 1774, Kerguelen ordered Dauphine to return to Mahavelona to trade slaves. Dauphine returned on 24 March.

Ensign Tromelin-Lanuguy took command of Dauphine on 14 June 1774. In late 1774 and December 1775, Dauphine sailed to Madagascar resupply Maurice Benyovszky.

On 29 November 1776, Dauphine rescued 7 women and an 8-month child, sole survivors of 160 slaves abandoned by the crew of a slave ship wrecked on "Isle aux Sables" (now Tromelin Island) on 27 September 1761, some 15 years earlier.

In 1778, Dauphine was reconfigured with a brig rigging.

In June 1780, she was captured by three British privateers.
