= 1985–86 South-West Indian Ocean cyclone season =

Cyclone season in the Southwest Indian Ocean

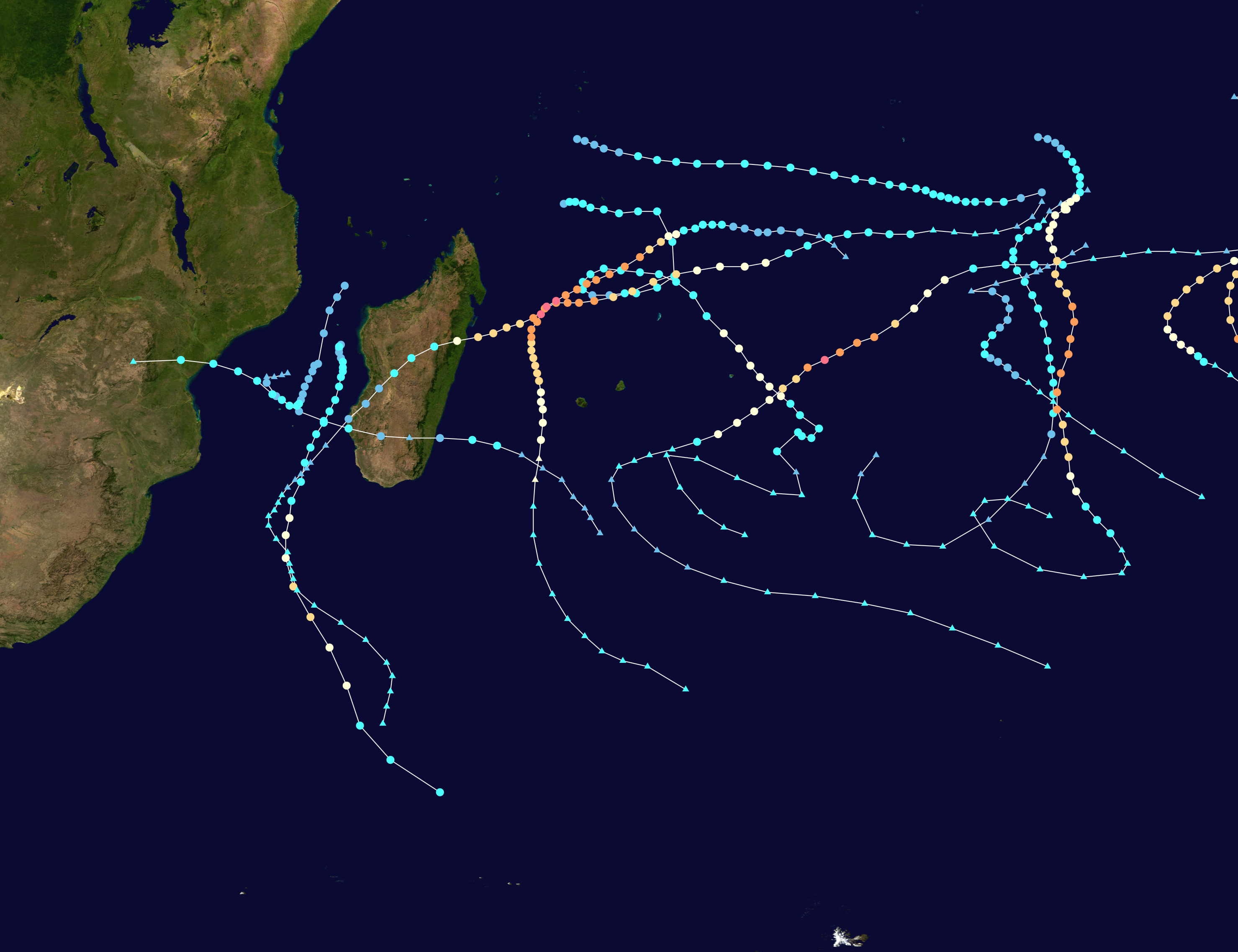
- Season summary map

Seasonal boundaries
- First system formed: December 23, 1985
- Last system dissipated: May 10, 1986

Strongest storm
- Name: Erinesta
  - Maximum winds: 170 km/h (105 mph) (10-minute sustained)
  - Lowest pressure: 927 hPa (mbar)

Seasonal statistics
- Total disturbances: 13
- Total depressions: 13
- Total storms: 12
- Tropical cyclones: 5
- Intense tropical cyclones: 1
- Total fatalities: 99
- Total damage: $150 million (1986 USD)

Related articles
- 1985–86 Australian region cyclone season; 1985–86 South Pacific cyclone season

The 1985–86 South-West Indian Ocean cyclone season was the first in which the Météo-France office (MFR) on Réunion tracked cyclones as far east as 90° E in Indian Ocean, south of the equator. Previously, the agency's area of responsibility was limited to 80° E. It was an active season with twelve named storms, of which five strengthened into tropical cyclone with 10 minute sustained winds of at least 120 km/h (75 mph). (Note: All wind speeds in the article are sustained over 10 minute, unless otherwise stated.) The first named storm was Tropical Storm Alifredy, which originated in the Mozambique Channel in late December and moved across Madagascar. However, the unofficial Joint Typhoon Warning Center (JTWC) tracked a short-lived storm in September.

Most of the activity occurred in 1986, with four storms in January, three of which briefly existed simultaneously on January 10. The first of these three, Tropical Storm Berobia, struck eastern Mozambique. Tropical Storm Costa was a series of three tropical depressions within the same broader system that persisted for 12 days, bringing gusty winds and rainfall to the Mascarene Islands. The strongest storm of the season, Erinesta, formed in late January and struck the tiny Tromelin Island, decimating the native rabbit population. Erinesta later produced 1,643 mm (64.7 in) of rainfall in the mountainous peaks of Réunion, one of the highest 24‑hour rainfall totals at the time at Cilaos. Two other storms in February – Filomena and Gista – moved southward for their durations and did not significantly impact land. In March, Cyclone Honorinina killed 99 people and caused $150 million (1986 USD) in damage when it struck eastern Madagascar. There were two other storms in March, Iarima and Jefotra, the latter of which brushed Rodrigues island with gusty winds. The final two storms of the season, Krisostoma and Lila, entered from the Australian basin in April and May, respectively, with Lila exiting the basin to end the season on May 10.

== Seasonal summary ==
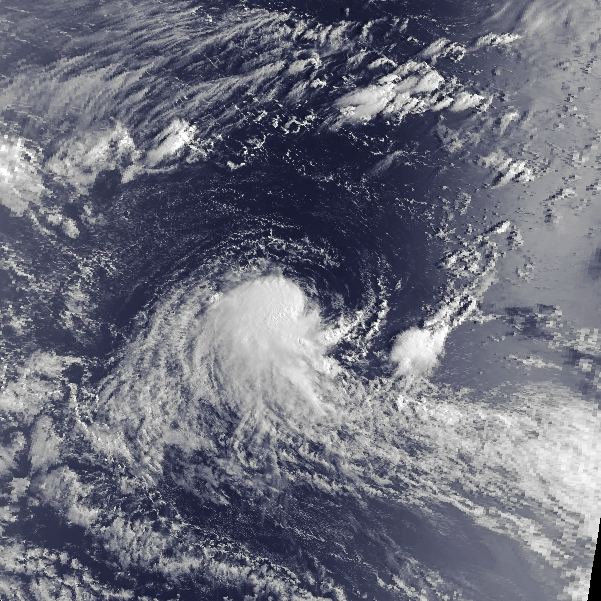
Satellite image of the unofficial September tropical storm

During the season, the Météo-France office (MFR) on Réunion island issued warnings in tropical cyclones within the basin. Using satellite imagery from National Oceanic and Atmospheric Administration, the agency estimated intensity through the Dvorak technique, and warned on tropical cyclones in the region from the coast of Africa to 90° E, south of the equator. In September 1985, their area of responsibility shifted from 80° E to the current 90° E, although lack of satellite imagery along the eastern periphery prevented complete coverage. The World Meteorological Organization would later label the MFR as a Regional Specialized Meteorological Center in 1993. The Joint Typhoon Warning Center (JTWC), which is a joint United States Navy – United States Air Force task force, also issued tropical cyclone warnings for the southwestern Indian Ocean. The season's twelve named storms was well above the average of nine, while the five tropical cyclones – storms attaining maximum sustained winds of at least 120 km/h (75 mph) – was average.

The MFR considered the tropical cyclone year to begin on August 1 and continue to July 31 of the following year. By December 1985, water temperatures were cooler than normal across the Indian Ocean. However, the monsoon intensified the following month, allowing for increased tropical cyclogenesis. There were no El Niño conditions by March.

In addition to the storms tracked by the MFR, the JTWC followed a short-lived tropical storm in September. Classified as Tropical Cyclone 01S, the storm developed on September 23 to the east-southeast of Diego Garcia, which is an atoll in the central Indian Ocean. It failed to intensify beyond peak 1 minute winds of 75 km/h (45 mph), and after passing south of Diego Garcia, the storm dissipated on September 29 south of the Seychelles.

== Systems ==
=== Tropical Depression Alifredy ===
- Tropical depression (MFR)
- Tropical storm (SSHWS)
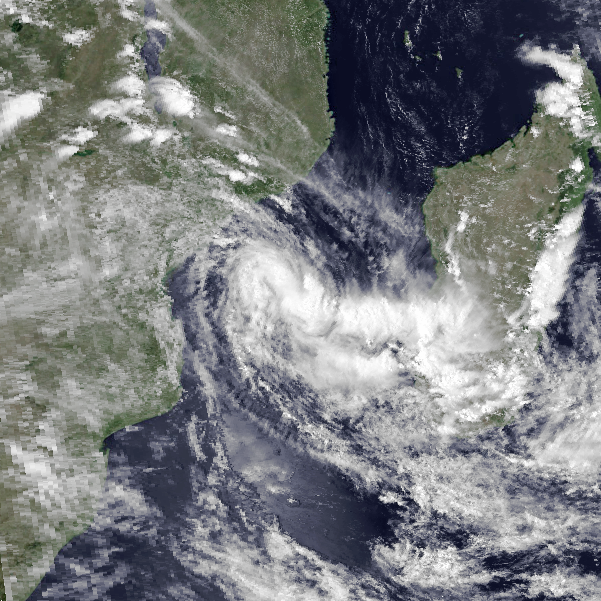
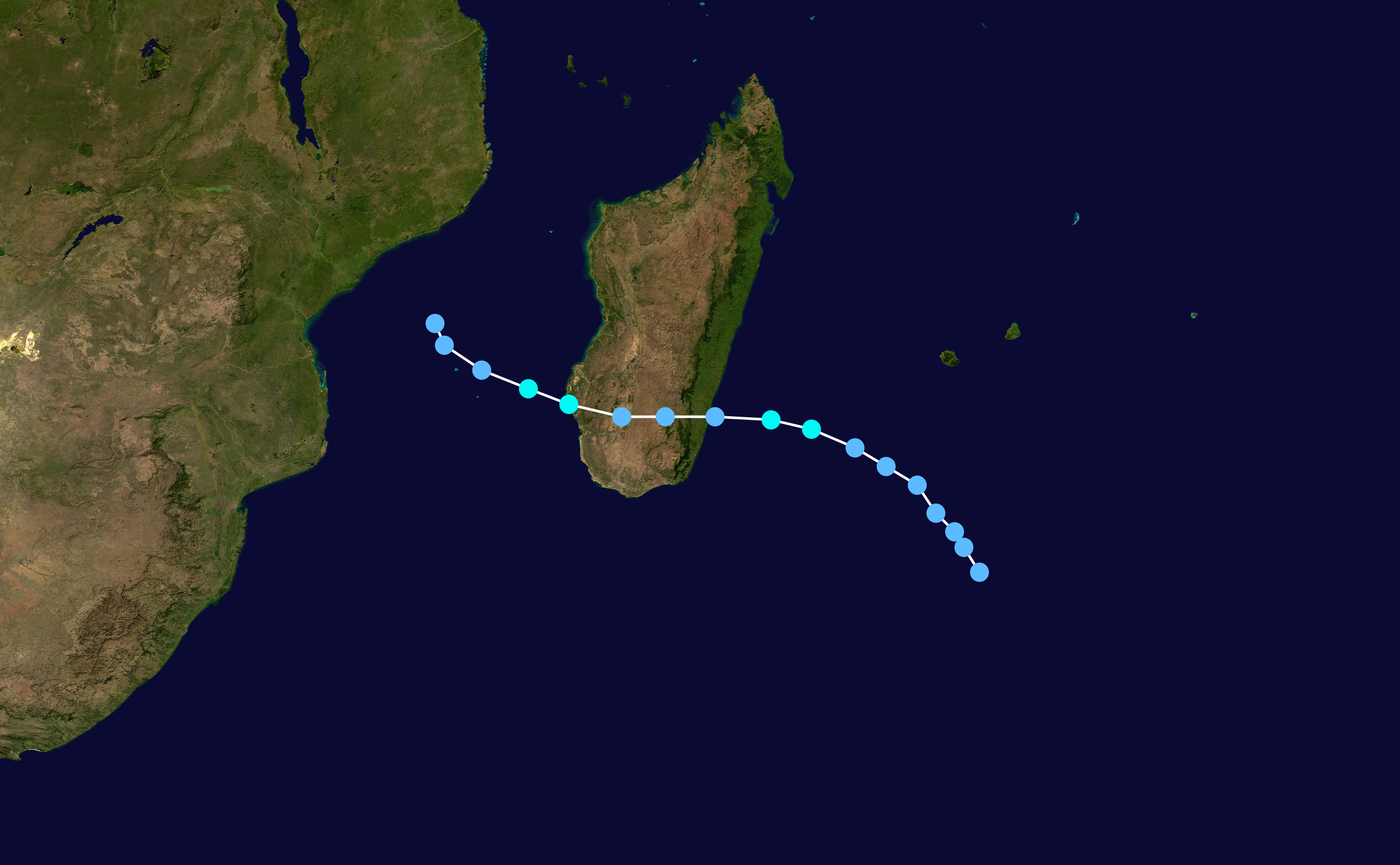
- Duration: December 23 – December 27
- Peak intensity: 50 km/h (30 mph) (10-min); 997 hPa (mbar)

On December 23, a tropical depression formed in the Mozambique Channel, accompanied by spiral rainbands toward the center. That day, the system reached peak winds of 65 km/h (40 mph), and the Madagascar Meteorological Service named it Alifredy. The storm moved quickly southeastward toward Madagascar. High pressures to the south prevented much development, and Alifredy moved ashore near Morondava in western Madagascar on December 24 at peak intensity. While crossing the island, the storm weakened into a tropical depression. Alifredy emerged into the open Indian Ocean and failed to restrengthen. It became extratropical and turned southeastward, dissipating on December 27 within the westerlies. The JTWC did not track the storm. Alifredy had little impacts on Madagascar; Morombe reported a peak wind gust of 56 km/h (35 mph).

=== Moderate Tropical Storm Berobia ===
- Moderate tropical storm (MFR)
- Tropical storm (SSHWS)
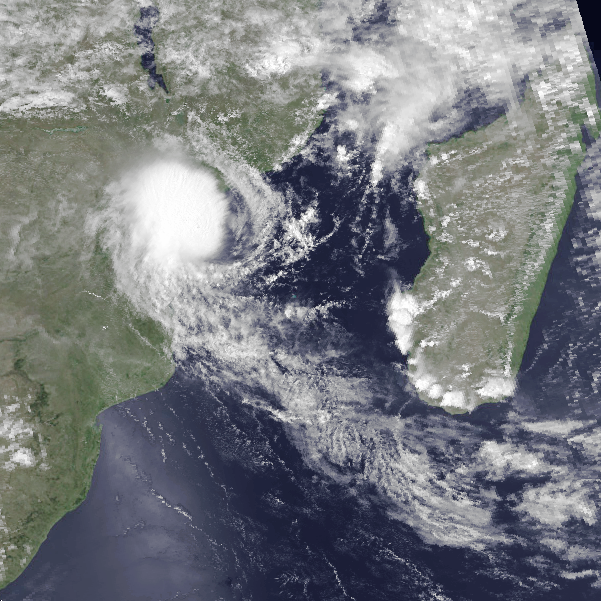
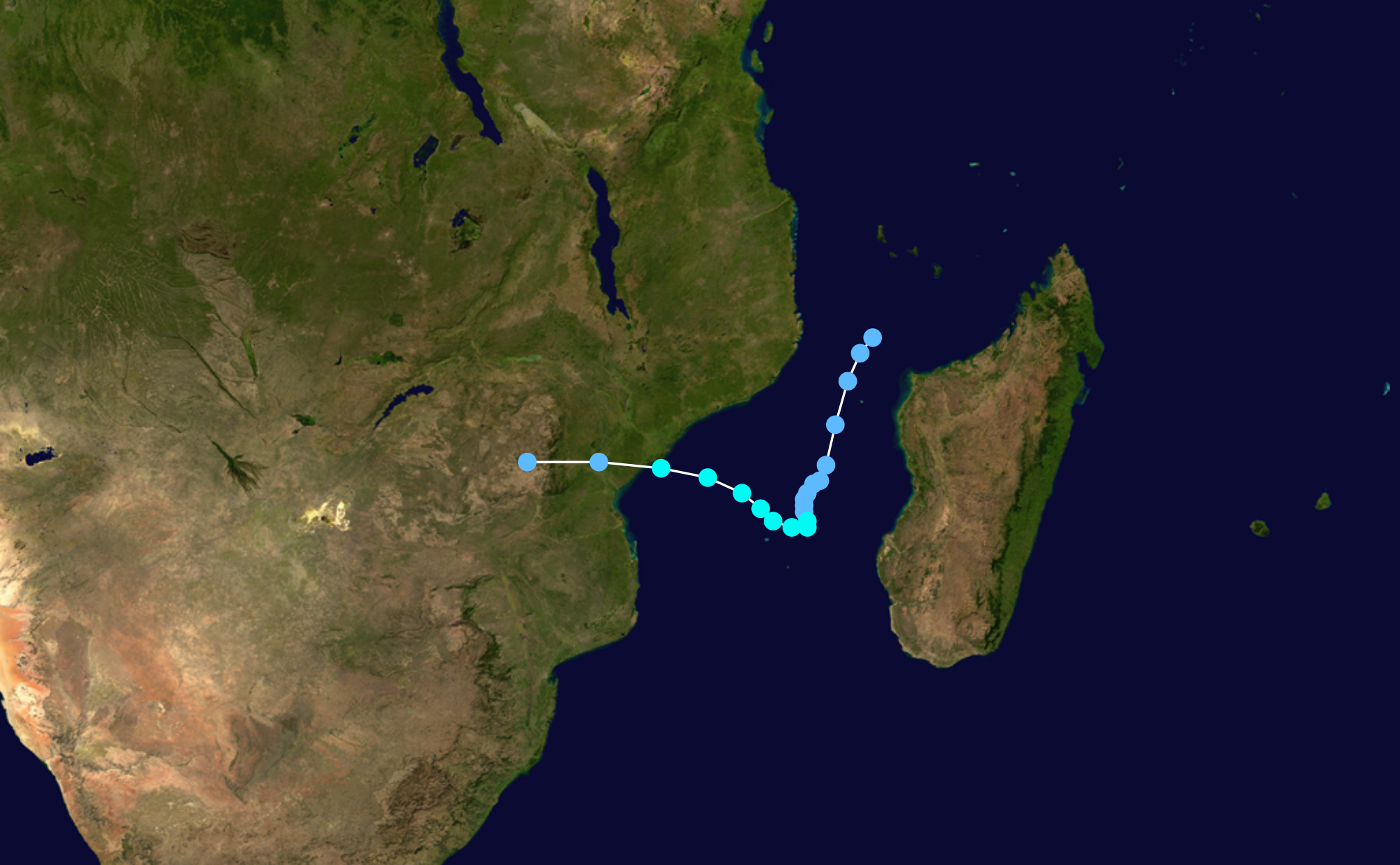
- Duration: January 5 – January 10
- Peak intensity: 85 km/h (50 mph) (10-min); 984 hPa (mbar)

The Intertropical Convergence Zone (ITCZ) spawned a tropical depression in the northern periphery of the Mozambique Channel on January 5, near the Comoros. Initially still located with the ITCZ, the system tracked south-southwestward, although its motion slowed due to a ridge to the south. It passed near Juan de Nova Island on January 6, producing gusts of 81 km/h (50 mph). By January 7, the system began disassociating itself from the ITCZ and it intensified. That night, the Madagascar Meteorological Service named the depression Berobia, which intensified into a moderate tropical storm the next day. Also on January 8, the JTWC began classifying the storm as Tropical Cyclone 06S. That day, Berobia began moving to the west-northwest, due to the strengthening ridge to the south. On January 9, the storm attained peak winds of 85 km/h (55 mph) according to the MFR; the JTWC estimated a slightly higher 1 minute peak of 95 km/h (60 mph). Late on January 9, Berobia made landfall about 125 km (75 mi) north of Beira, Mozambique, and it dissipated the next day after entering Zimbabwe. The remnants of Berobia dropped heavy rainfall in northeastern Zimbabwe, with a 24‑hour peak of 179 mm (7.0 in).

=== Severe Tropical Storm Costa ===
- Severe tropical storm (MFR)
- Category 1 tropical cyclone (SSHWS)
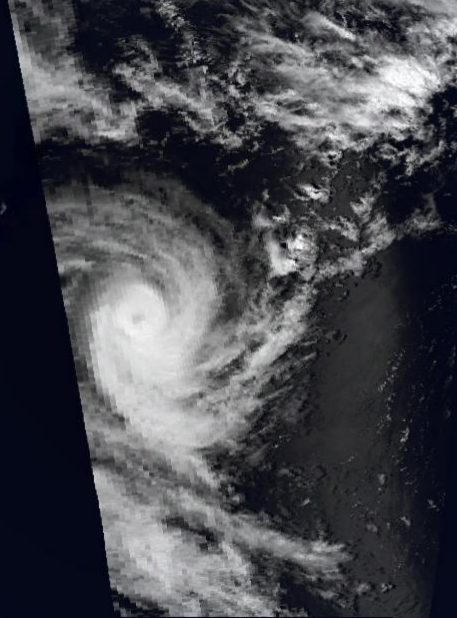
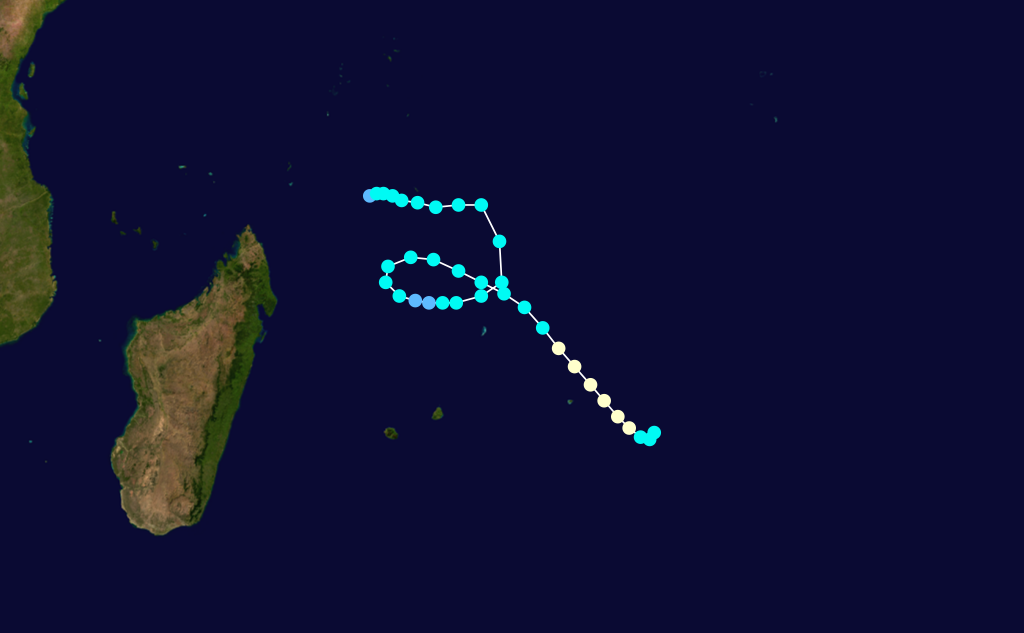
- Duration: January 7 – January 19
- Peak intensity: 95 km/h (60 mph) (10-min); 976 hPa (mbar)

Tropical Storm Costa was a series of three different tropical depressions within the same broader system that persisted for 12 days east of Madagascar, all given the same name. The first circulation formed on January 7 between the northeast coast of Madagascar and Agaléga. Later that day, the Madagascar Meteorological Service named it Costa, and the JTWC labeled it Tropical Cyclone 05S. It moved eastward and later turned to the southeast, passing near Agaléga before weakening while moving into the ITCZ. Another circulation formed to the east of Costa, and the original circulation dissipated on January 9. The new center moved to the west-southwest toward St. Brandon, although it was disorganized, dissipating on January 11. A third circulation formed on the previous day to the east, becoming a tropical depression with well-organized rainbands. This third system would last the longest, originally moving to the northeast before curving southeastward.

On January 12, Costa intensified into a moderate tropical storm. On the next day, the JTWC upgraded it to the equivalent of a minimal hurricane, and the MFR estimated peak winds of 95 km/h (60 mph). Costa weakened briefly on January 14 while passing about 100 km (60 mi) east of Rodrigues, although it re-attained its former peak on the next day while accelerating southeastward. Costa thereafter weakened rapidly and moved erratically toward the southwest. By January 15, it deteriorated into a minimal tropical storm, and meandered for several days. On January 19, Costa dissipated within the flow of the westerlies.

When Costa formed, it passed near Agaléga, producing wind gusts of 145 km/h (90 mph). The storm approached St. Brandon twice; on its first passage, Costa produced gusts of 91 km/h (57 mph) during a strong rainband. Later, the storm dropped 64 mm (2.5 in) of rainfall on Rodrigues while producing gusts of 107 km/h (66 mph).

=== Tropical Cyclone Delifina ===
- Tropical cyclone (MFR)
- Category 3 tropical cyclone (SSHWS)
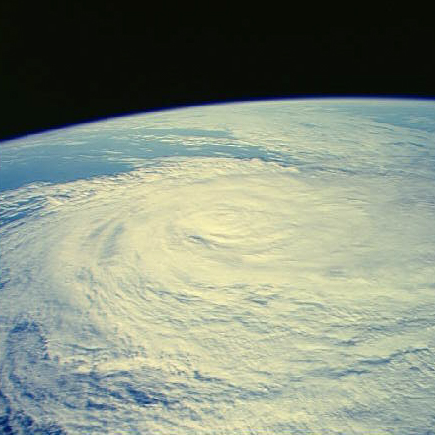
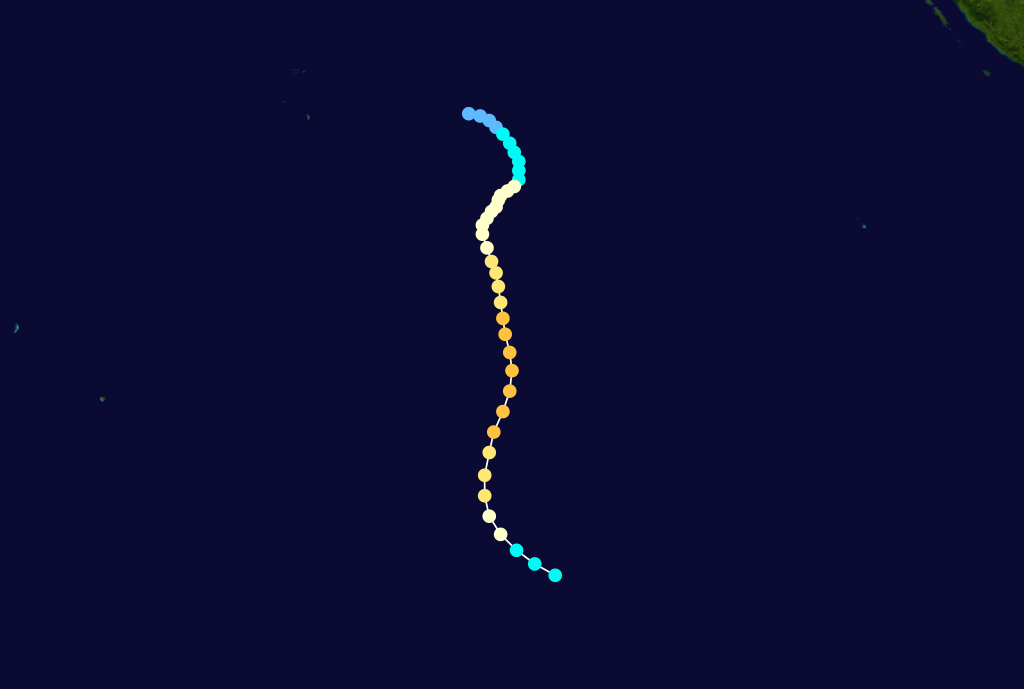
- Duration: January 10 – January 19
- Peak intensity: 135 km/h (85 mph) (10-min); 954 hPa (mbar)

The monsoon was active in early January across the Indian Ocean, spawning what would eventually become Tropical Cyclone Delifina. On January 7, the JTWC classified the system as Tropical Cyclone 04S to the east-southeast Tropical Storm Costa. However, the MFR did not classify it initially due to lack of data. The system had a curved area of convection, and organized enough for MFR to designate it Tropical Storm Delifina on January 10. On the same day, the JTWC upgraded the storm to the equivalent of a minimal hurricane. The storm moved generally southward, after an initial westward movement. Delifina gradually intensified, becoming a tropical cyclone on January 13. By that time, the storm had an eye in the center of deep organized convection. The MFR estimated peak winds of 135 km/h (85 mph), while the JTWC estimated 1 minute winds of 205 km/h (125 mph). Subsequently, Delifina weakened as it progressed southward. After turning to the southeast, the deteriorating storm turned sharply northwestward between two ridges. Delifina turned back to the east and dissipated on January 19 at nearly the same longitude where it formed.

=== Intense Tropical Cyclone Erinesta ===
- Intense tropical cyclone (MFR)
- Category 4 tropical cyclone (SSHWS)
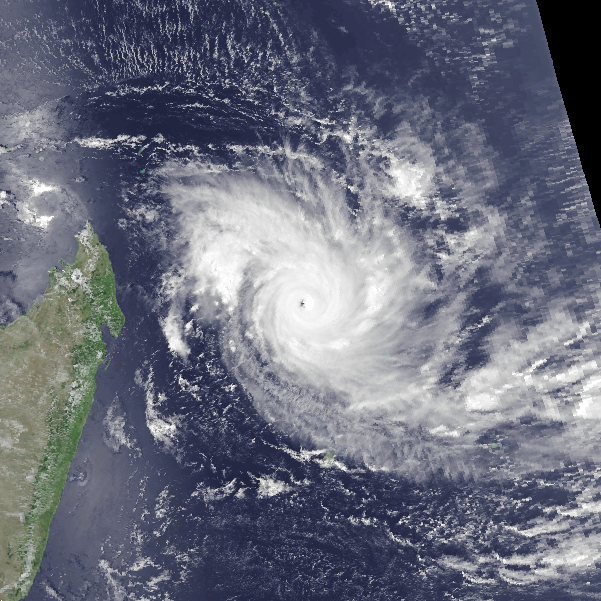
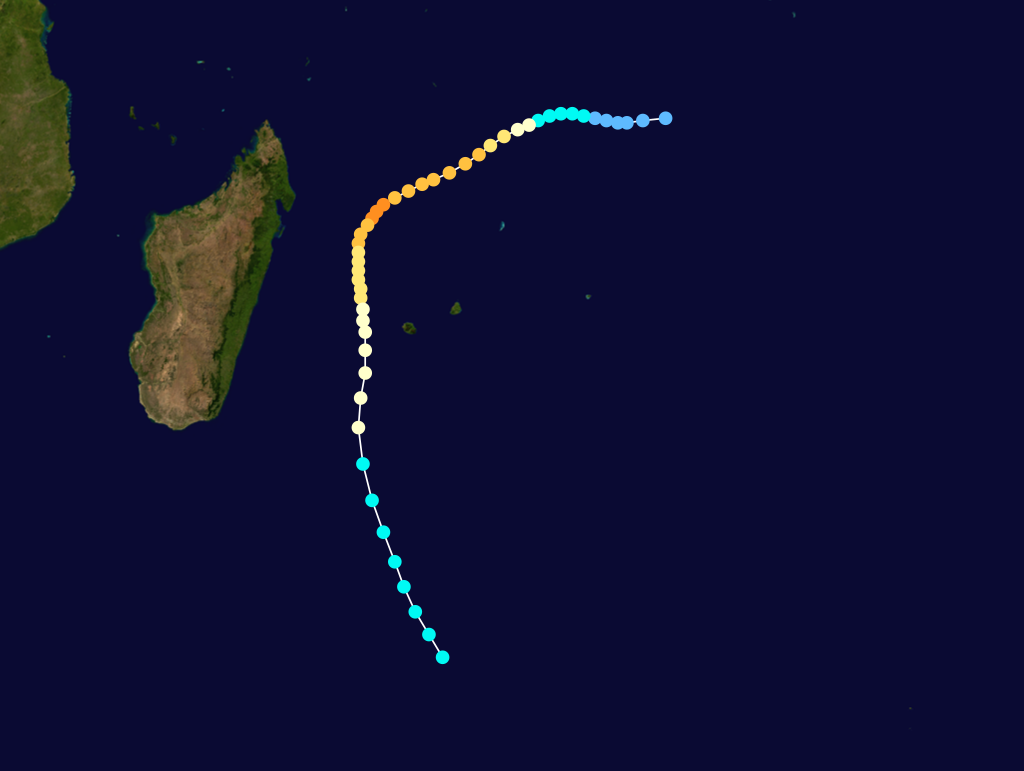
- Duration: January 29 – February 11
- Peak intensity: 170 km/h (105 mph) (10-min); 927 hPa (mbar)

Satellite imagery indicated that a tropical disturbance formed on January 29 to the southwest of Diego Garcia. It moved westward and slowly organized, becoming a moderate tropical storm on January 31. On the same day, the JTWC classified the storm as Tropical Cyclone 13S, and the Mauritius Meteorological Service named it Erinesta. Its track shifted to a slow west-southwest trajectory while intensifying. The JTWC upgraded the storm to the equivalent of a minimal hurricane on February 1, and the MFR upgraded Erinesta to tropical cyclone status on the next day. On February 4, the cyclone attained peak winds, becoming one of the strongest storms in the basin in several decades. The JTWC estimated peak 1 minute winds of 215 km/h (135 mph), and the MFR estimated peak winds of 170 km/h (105 mph). Shortly after Erinesta reached peak intensity, it passed within 20 km (12 mi) of Tromelin Island. The storm curved southward due to an approaching trough, briefly threatening to strike Réunion. However, a ridge built behind the trough, bringing the storm between the east coast of Madagascar and the Mascarene Islands. Erinesta gradually weakened, passing west of Réunion as a severe tropical storm on February 7. The storm accelerated to the south-southeast and later became extratropical, dissipating on February 11 within the westerlies.

Passing near Tromelin at peak intensity, Erinesta produced peak wind gusts of 234 km/h (145 mph) before damaging the anemometer, with peak winds estimated as high as 250 km/h (155 mph). The high winds damaged every building and scientific instrument on the island. The passage of the storm killed Tromelin's entire rabbit population. Along the east coast of Madagascar, Erinesta produced 83 km/h (52 mph) wind gusts and 24‑hour rainfall of 64.8 mm (2.55 in) at Toamasina. Lastly, the cyclone passed west of Réunion, where ten days of precipitation accumulated to 1,643 mm (64.7 in) at Cilaos, of which 1,017 mm (40.0 in) fell over 24 hours. The 24‑hour total there was among the highest on record, surpassing even Cyclone Hyacinthe, the wettest storm on record. In one hour, Erinesta dropped 70 mm (2.8 in) of rainfall, which only occurs every two and a half years. This helped replenish aquifer levels, after two years of drought conditions. The rains caused 1 in 10 year flooding in portions of the island, reaching 30 m^{3}/s (1,060 ft^{3}/s) at Ravine Blanche. While moving past the island, Erinesta produced peak gusts of 139 km/h (86 mph) in the mountainous interior at Plaine des Cafres. The cyclone also produced very high waves along coastal roads, closing them for four days and damaging guard rails.

=== Moderate Tropical Storm Filomena ===
- Moderate tropical storm (MFR)
- Tropical storm (SSHWS)
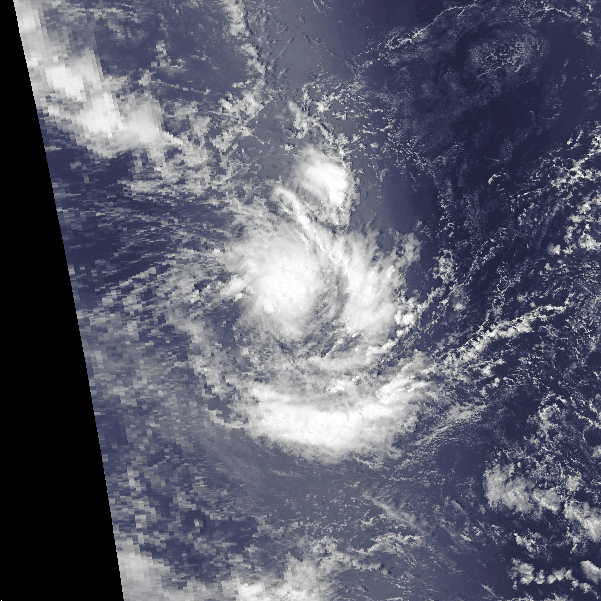
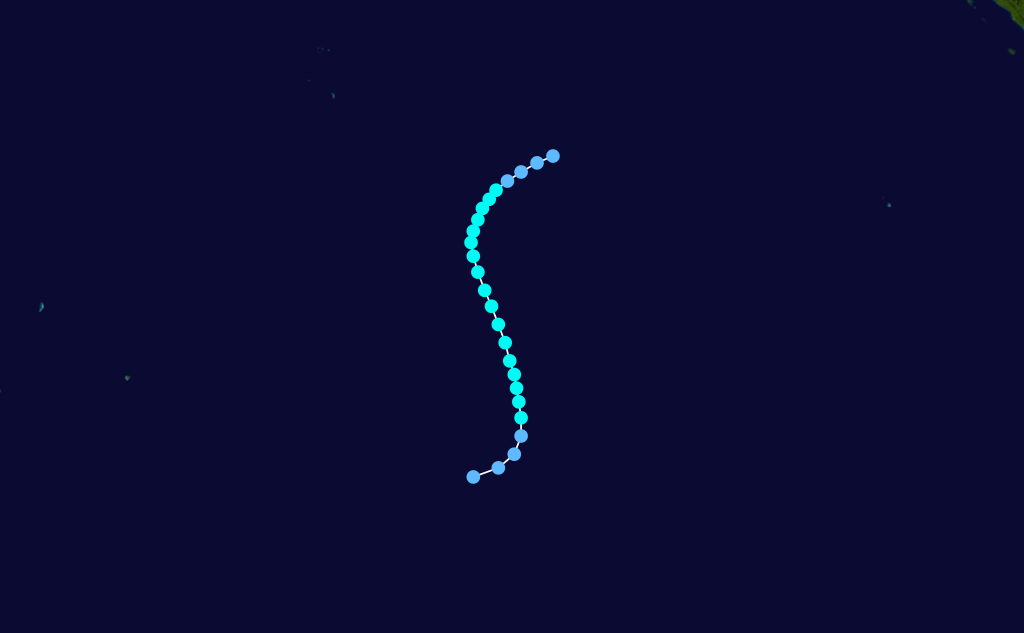
- Duration: February 5 – February 12
- Peak intensity: 65 km/h (40 mph) (10-min); 991 hPa (mbar)

In early February, an area of disturbed weather persisted around Diego Garcia, although lack of satellite imagery made it difficult to track the system at first. On February 6, satellite images indicated that a tropical storm formed, given the name Filomena by the Mauritius Meteorological Service. Also on February 6, the JTWC classified it as Tropical Cyclone 14S. Initially the storm moved to the west, although Filomena turned southeastward into an area of low pressure. The storm never intensified beyond winds of 65 km/h (40 mph) according to the MFR. However, the JTWC estimated 1 minute winds of 100 km/h (60 mph). Filomena gradually weakened as it progress southward. On February 11, the system turned westward and later northwest due to a ridge to the south, having weakened into a tropical depression. Filomena dissipated on the next day.

=== Severe Tropical Storm Gista ===
- Severe tropical storm (MFR)
- Category 2 tropical cyclone (SSHWS)
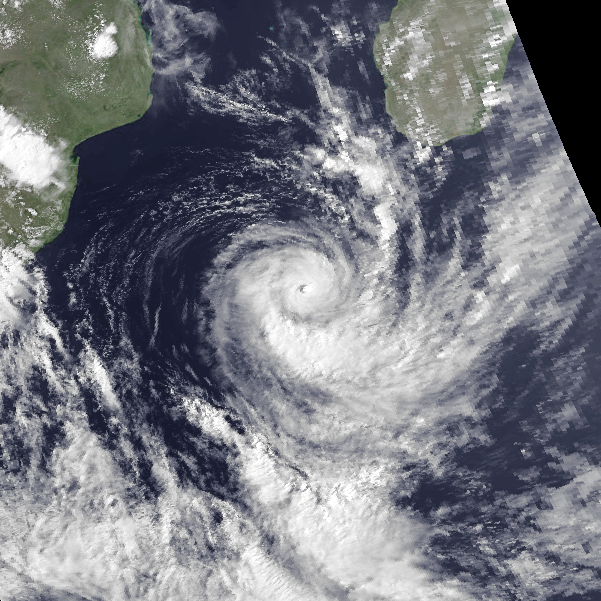
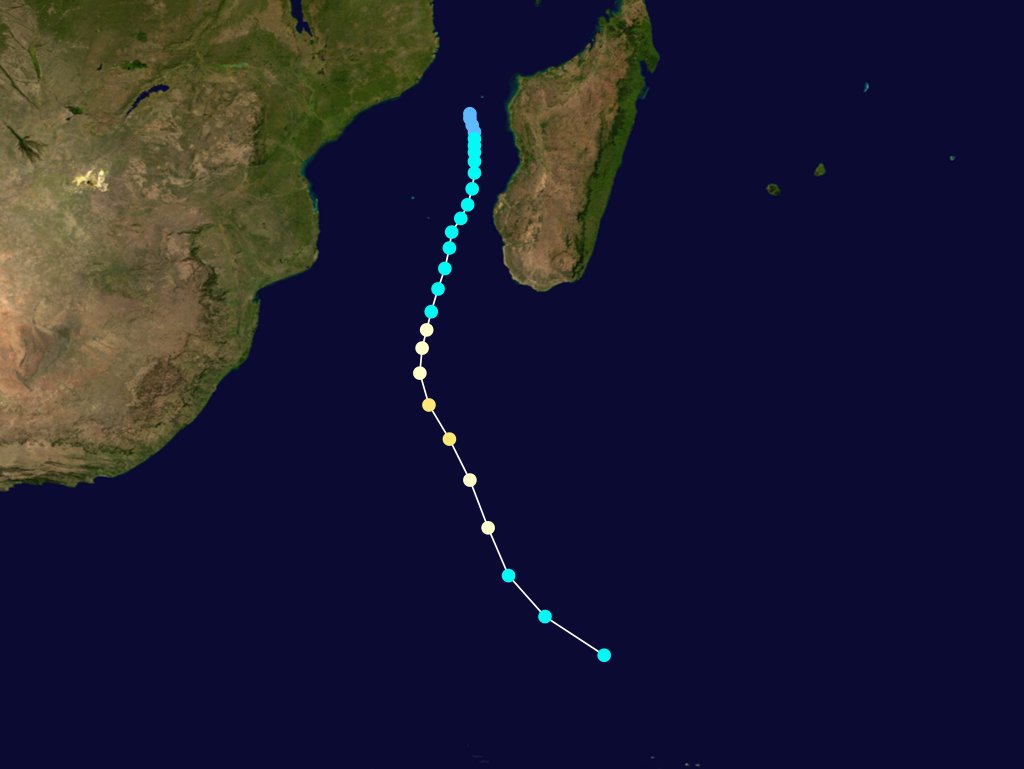
- Duration: February 18 – February 25
- Peak intensity: 95 km/h (60 mph) (10-min); 976 hPa (mbar)

On February 18, a circulation formed in the Mozambique Channel, based on satellite imagery. That day, it developed into Moderate Tropical Storm Gista, Early on February 19, the JTWC classified it as Tropical Cyclone 19S. Gista moved generally southward, initially moving to the southeast toward western Madagascar and later curving to the southwest, bringing it within 100 km (60 mi) of the coast. The storm gradually intensified while moving away from the country, reaching peak 10 minute winds of 95 km/h (60 mph) on January 21 about 120 km (75 mi) east of Europa Island. According to the MFR, Gista became extratropical that night, although the JTWC continued tracking it for several more days. According to the JTWC, Gista intensified to the equivalent of a minimal hurricane on February 22 to the southwest of Madagascar, and the next day reached peak 1 minute winds of 160 km/h (100 mph). Gista accelerated to the southeast and dissipated late on February 24 in the westerlies.

While Gista was moving along the west coast of Madagascar, it produced peak wind gusts of 82 km/h (51 mph) at Maintirano. It later produced wind gusts of 72 km/h (45 mph) on Europa Island.

=== Tropical Cyclone Honorinina ===
- Tropical cyclone (MFR)
- Category 3 tropical cyclone (SSHWS)
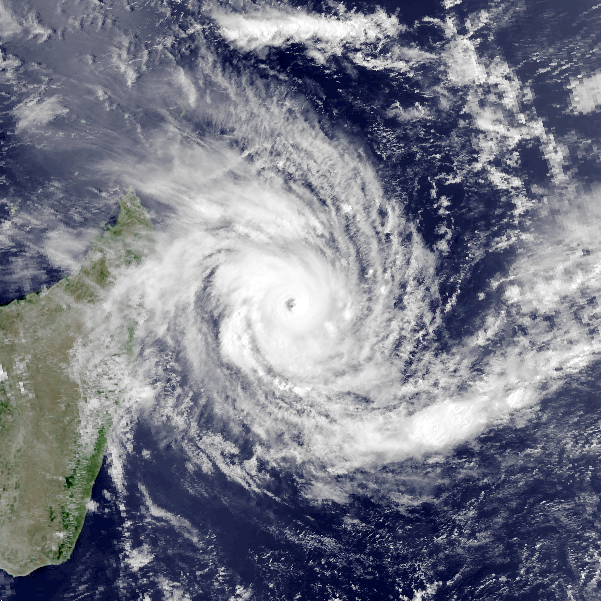
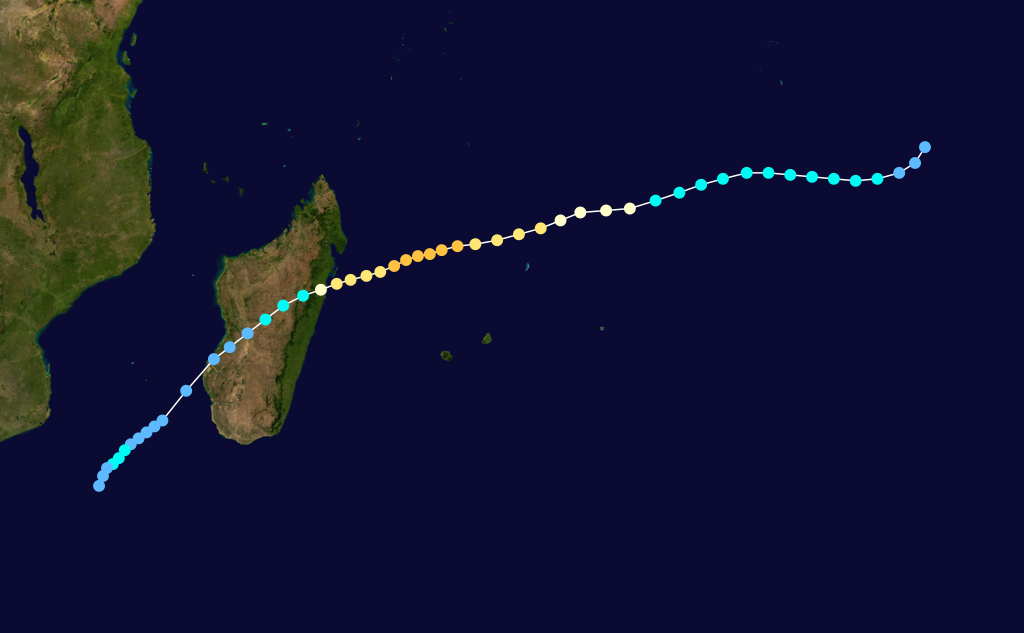
- Duration: March 7 – March 23
- Peak intensity: 150 km/h (95 mph) (10-min); 941 hPa (mbar)

Tropical Storm Honorinina formed on March 9 to the south of Diego Garcia. It moved generally to the west-southwest due to a ridge to the south, gradually intensifying. On March 12, the MFR upgraded Honorinina to tropical cyclone status, which is the equivalent of a minimal hurricane. On the next day, the cyclone attained maximum sustained winds of 150 km/h (95 mph) while in the vicinity of Tromelin Island, although the JTWC estimated peak 1 minute winds of 205 km/h (125 mph). Honorinina weakened subsequently before making landfall about 40 km (25 mi) north of Toamasina, Madagascar with winds of 135 km/h (85 mph). The storm weakened further over land, moving southwestward across the country. It emerged into the Mozambique Channel and became extratropical on March 18. Honorinina turned to the southeast, dissipating on March 23.

Early in its duration, the storm produced gusty winds along St. Brandon, and it later brought gusts of 158 km/h (98 mph) on Tromelin Island. However, effects were worst in Madagascar, especially in Toamasina near where the storm made landfall. Damage spread along 800 km (500 mi) of the coastline and reached 100 km (60 mi) inland from the landfall point, with many towns severely affected. In Toamasina, the cyclone damaged the main port, the airport, and several warehouses, resulting in $17 million (1986 USD) of lost inventory. Thousands of houses were damaged, leaving 83,885 people homeless; a housing program earlier set up after Cyclone Kamisy in 1984 was extended to help storm victims after Honorinina. Nationwide, the cyclone killed 99 people and caused $150 million (1986 USD) in damage.

=== Moderate Tropical Storm Iarima ===
- Moderate tropical storm (MFR)
- Tropical storm (SSHWS)
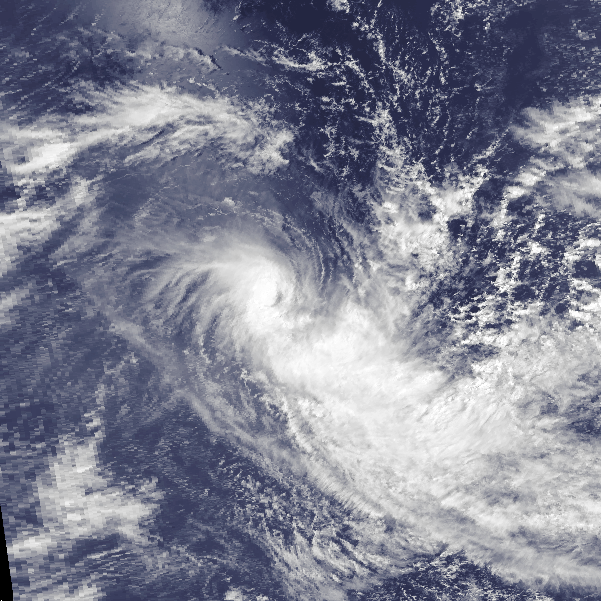
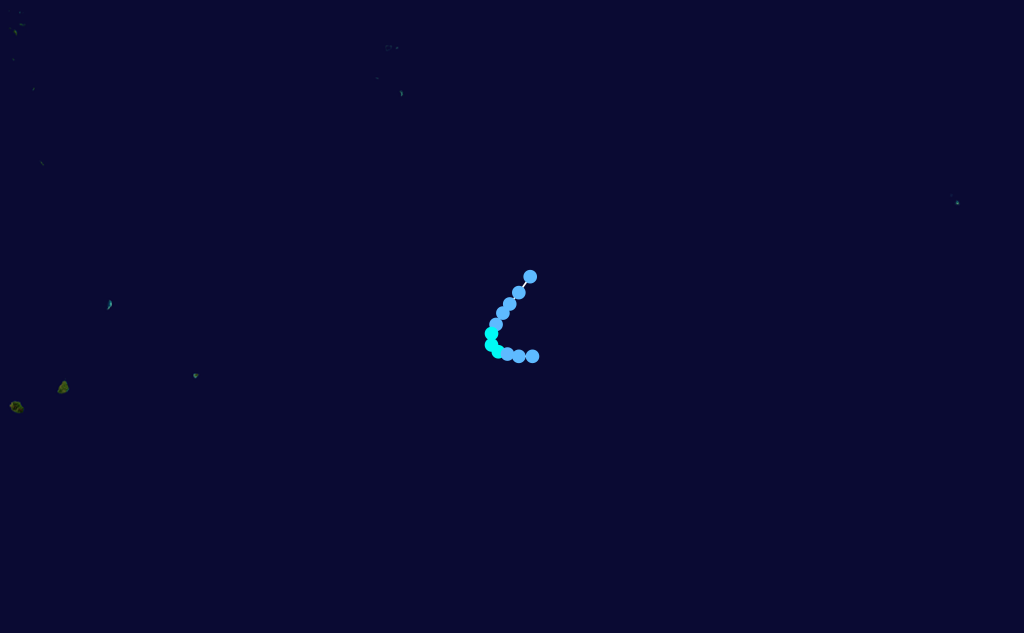
- Duration: March 13 – March 18
- Peak intensity: 65 km/h (40 mph) (10-min); 991 hPa (mbar)

While Honorinina was intensifying and moving toward Madagascar, another system was forming on March 13 south-southeast of Diego Garcia. At 06:00 UTC that day, a tropical storm formed, although it was not named Iarima until the next day. Also on March 13, the JTWC began classifying the storm as Tropical Cyclone 26S. Iarima initially moved southwestward, failing to intensify beyond winds of 65 km/h (40 mph). On March 15, the storm turned and accelerated to the southeast after an anticyclone formed between Iarima and Honorinina. It subsequently weakened, dissipating on March 18 while approaching 90° E.

=== Tropical Cyclone Jefotra ===
- Tropical cyclone (MFR)
- Category 4 tropical cyclone (SSHWS)
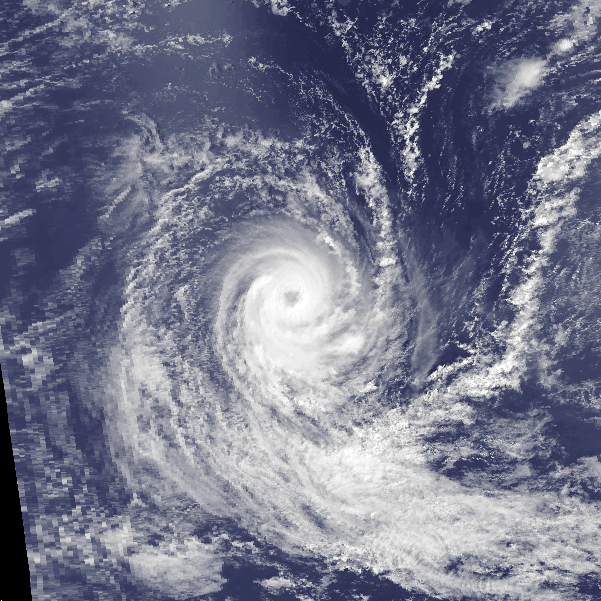
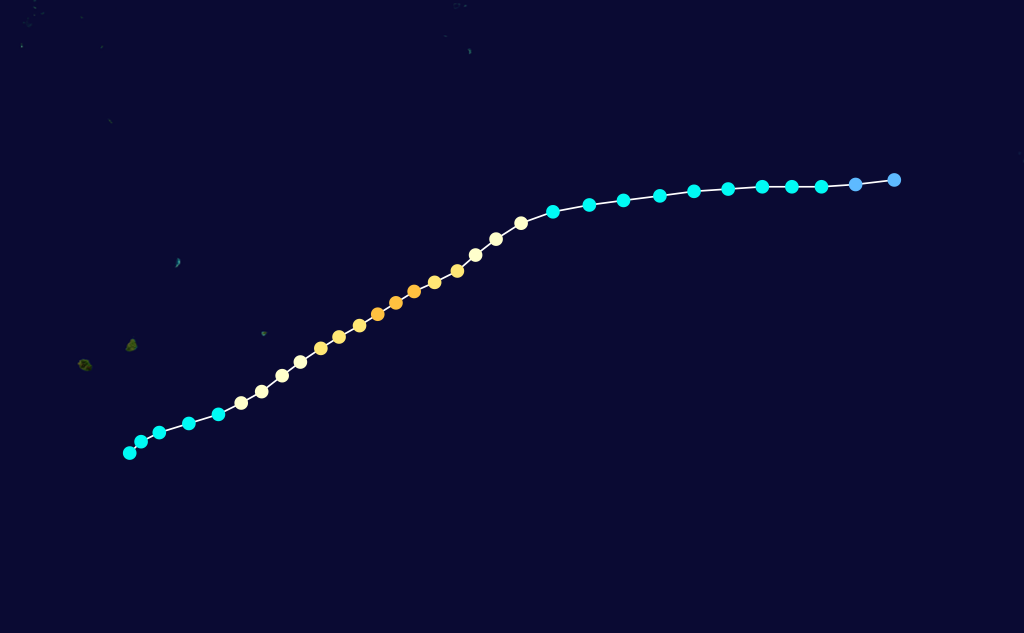
- Duration: March 27 – April 5
- Peak intensity: 135 km/h (85 mph) (10-min); 954 hPa (mbar)

An area of low pressure persisted in the northeast portion of the basin toward the end of March. On March 27, a tropical depression formed to the southeast of Diego Garcia. The system moved west-southwestward, quickly intensifying into a tropical storm. The Mauritius Meteorological Center named the storm Jefotra, while the JTWC designated it as Tropical Cyclone 27S. On March 28, the JTWC upgraded Jefotra to the equivalent of a minimal hurricane, and on the next day, the MFR upgraded the storm to tropical cyclone status. On March 29, Jefotra attained its peak intensity; the JTWC estimated 1 minute winds of 195 km/h (120 mph), and the MFR estimated 10 minute winds of 135 km/h (85 mph). By that time, the motion shifted more to the southwest, bringing it 400 km (250 mi) east of Rodrigues; winds on the island remained less than 74 km/h (46 mph). The storm gradually weakened to tropical depression status by April 2. That day, an approaching cold front turned Jefotra to the southeast, and the storm became extratropical. On April 5, the circulation dissipated within the cold front.

=== Severe Tropical Storm Alison–Krisostoma ===
- Severe tropical storm (MFR)
- Category 2 tropical cyclone (SSHWS)
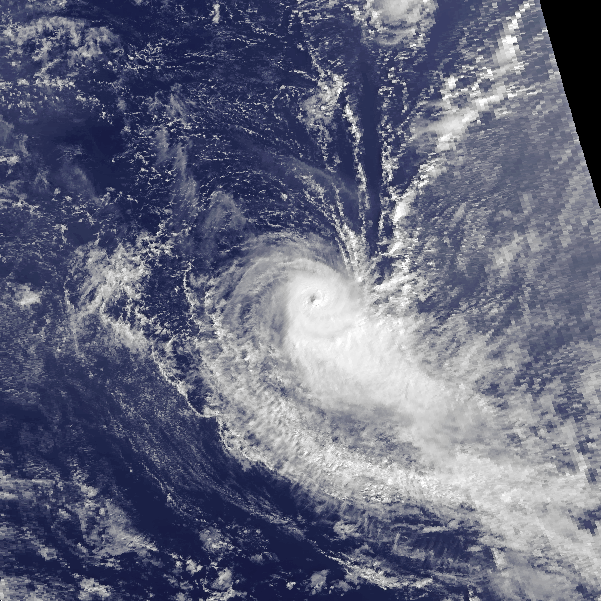
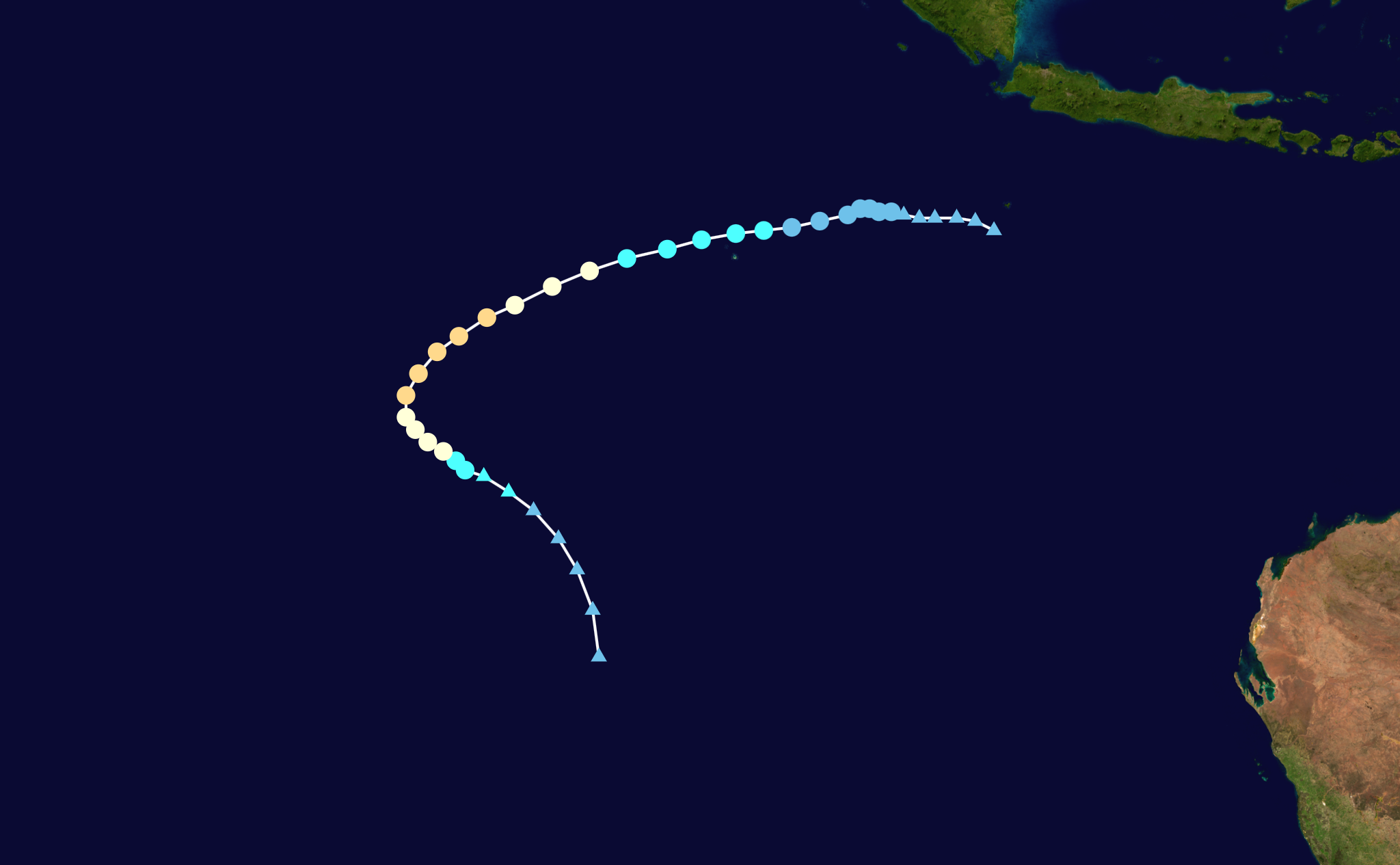
- Duration: April 10 (entered basin) – April 13 (exited basin)
- Peak intensity: 95 km/h (60 mph) (10-min); 974 hPa (mbar)

A tropical low formed in the Australian basin on April 4 to the southwest of Sumatra. It moved to the west-southwest without much development, steered by a ridge to the south. It attained gale-force winds on April 7 and was named Alison by the Bureau of Meteorology in Australia (BoM). On the next day, the storm passed just north of the Cocos Islands, and the BoM upgraded Alison to the equivalent of a tropical cyclone. The JTWC also classified it as Tropical Cyclone 28S. The storm crossed 90° E into the south-west Indian Ocean on April 10, and the Mauritius Meteorological Service renamed it Krisostoma. The MFR estimated peak winds of 95 km/h (60 mph), much less than the JTWC 1 minute estimate of 160 km/h (100 mph). An eastward area of low pressure turned the storm to the southeast, crossing back into the Australian basin on April 13. On the next day, the storm dissipated. The JTWC analyzed the end of Krisostoma as turning back to the west-southwest without exiting the south-west Indian Ocean.

=== Tropical Cyclone Billy–Lila ===
- Tropical cyclone (MFR)
- Category 3 tropical cyclone (SSHWS)
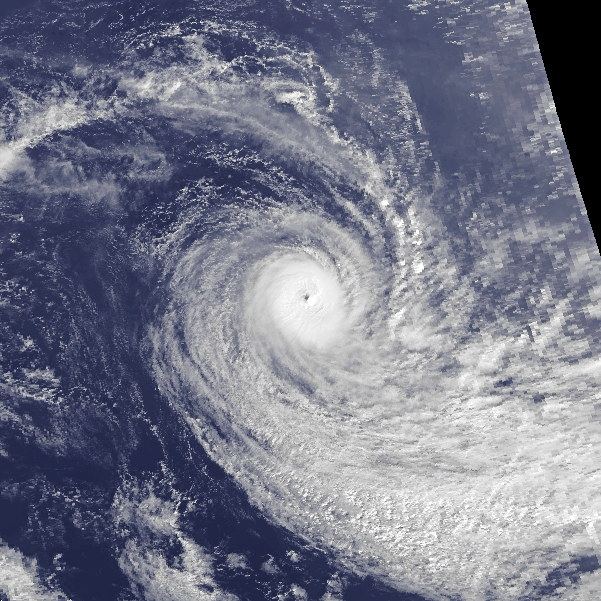
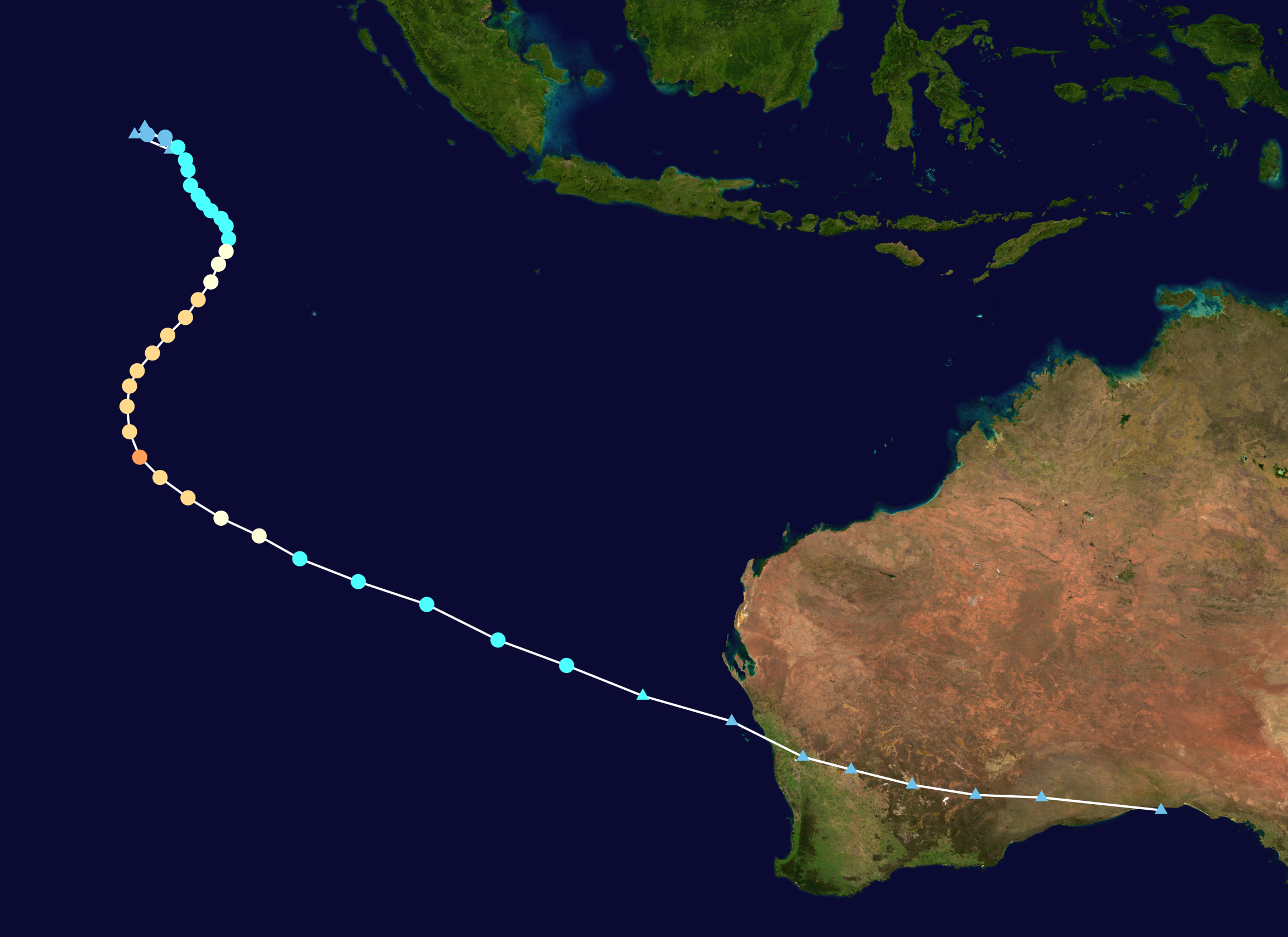
- Duration: May 9 (entered basin) – May 10 (exited basin)
- Peak intensity: 135 km/h (85 mph) (10-min); 950 hPa (mbar)

On May 4, a monsoonal low developed southwest of Sumatra in the Australian basin. It moved to the southeast and intensified into a tropical storm on May 5, given the name Billy. That day, the JTWC classified the system as Tropical Cyclone 32S. The storm turned to the southwest due to a ridge to the south, crossing 90° E into the south-west Indian Ocean on May 9. At that time, the Mauritius Meteorological Service renamed the storm Lila. The storm curved more to the south due to an approaching trough, Early on May 10, the MFR estimated peak winds of 135 km/h (85 mph), and the JTWC estimated peak 1 minute winds of 165 km/h (105 mph). Shortly thereafter, Lila crossed 90° E back into the Australian basin, where it was renamed Billy. The storm intensified further before weakening steadily due to wind shear, all while accelerating to the southeast. The circulation eventually crossed the Western Australian coast near Geraldton on May 14. Moving across southwestern Australia, Billy dissipated on May 15 in the Great Australian Bight off South Australia.

== See also ==
- Atlantic hurricane seasons: 1985, 1986
- Eastern Pacific hurricane seasons: 1985, 1986
- Western Pacific typhoon seasons: 1985, 1986
- North Indian Ocean cyclone seasons: 1985, 1986
