= Charles-Louis Saulx de Rosnevet =

Charles-Louis Saulx de Rosnevet (circa 1734 — Port au Prince, December 20, 1776) was a French Navy officer. He was a member of the Académie de Marine, and took part in the Second voyage of Kerguelen.

== Biography ==
Rosnevet joined the Navy as a Garde-Marine on 6 July 1750. He was promoted to Lieutenant on 1 May 1763.

On 16 March 1773, he was given command of the frigate Oiseau, and took part in the Second voyage of Kerguelen.

Rosnevet was promoted to Captain on 28 June 1755.

== Sources and references ==
Notes

Bibliography

- Doneaud Du Plan, Alfred (1878). Histoire de l'Académie de marine (in French). Paris: Berger-Levrault.
- Lacour-Gayet, Georges (1905). La marine militaire de la France sous le règne de Louis XVI. Paris: Honoré Champion. OCLC 763372623.

External links

- Rouxel, Jean-Christophe. "Charles Louis SAULX de ROSNEVET". Parcours de vie dans la Royale.
- Henrat, Philippe. "SAULX de ROSNEVET, Charles Louis". Comité des travaux historiques et scientifiques Institut rattaché à l’École nationale des chartes.
