= Jacques Marie Boudin de Tromelin de La Nuguy =

French Navy officer (1751–1798)

- Born: 31 May 1751; Ploujean, France
- Died: 4 December 1798 (aged 47)
- Relatives: Bernard-Marie Boudin de Tromelin
- Military career
- Branch: French Navy; Armée des Princes
- Rank: Major de vaisseau
- Conflicts: American Revolutionary War

Jacques Marie Boudin de Tromelin, Chevalier de La Nuguy (Note: Alternatively written Tromelin-Lanuguy or Lanuguy-Tromelin) (Ploujean, 31 May 1751 — Norge, 4 December 1798) was a French Navy officer. He served in the Indian Ocean under Suffren during the American Revolutionary War. Tromelin Island is named after him.

== Biography ==
Born to Marie-Françoise Le Diouguel de Penanru and Jacques Boudin de Tromelin, Tromelin-Lanuguy joined the Navy as a Garde-Marine in Brest on 12 January 1766. He served in Bayonne and Saint-Malo.

From 1 November 1767 to 27 January 1768, he served on the 32-gun frigate Sensible, under Captain du Chaffault, for a cruise to the Caribbean. Sick, he was disembarked at Saint-Domingue and returned to Brest on a merchantman.

He then served as first officer on the cutter Lézard, under his older brother Tromelin-Launay, departing Lorient in October 1772 to arrive at Isle de France (Mauritius) in June 1773. He was promoted to Ensign on 1 October 1773.

=== Dauphine ===
Tromelin-Lanuguy then served as first officer on Dauphine, taking part in Kerguelen's second expedition. After the return of the ships to Madagascar, he took command of Dauphine on 14 June 1774. On 29 November 1776, Dauphine rescued 7 women and an 8-month child, sole survivors of 160 slaves abandoned by the crew of a slave ship wrecked on "Isle aux Sables" (now Tromelin Island) on 27 September 1761, some 15 years earlier.

In August 1778, Tromelin-Lanuguy was appointed to the 22-gun fluyt Pintade, bound for France. He left Isle de France on 28 December 1778 and arrived at Lorient on 2 July 1779. On the way, he repelled an attack from a British privateer, which earned him the Cross of the Order of Saint Louis and a promotion to Lieutenant.

=== War of American Independence ===
During the War of American Independence, Tromelin-Lanuguy served in the Indian Ocean in a squadron under Rear-Admiral Thomas d'Estienne d'Orves. He was commanding the corvette Sylphide when the squadron departed Isle de France on 7 December 1781. On 9 February 1782, Estienne d'Orves died and Suffren assumed command of the squadron. He re-appointed his captains and gave Tromelin-Lanuguy command of the corvette Subtile.

In March 1782, in the wake of the Battle of Sadras, Suffren transferred Tromelin-Lanuguy to Pourvoyeuse, replacing Lieutenant de Ruyter. Tromelin-Lanuguy took part in the Battle of Providien on 12 April 1782.

In April 1782, Tromelin-Lanuguy escorted prizes captured by Bellone to Tharangambadi, and from there sailed to Malaca to procure supplies and spare parts. On his journey back, he encountered five East Indiamen, resulting in the action of 10 September 1782 after which he withdrew. Upon his return, Tromelin-Lanuguy suffered the scorn of Suffren, who blamed him for failing to press his attack on the East Indiamen. Suffren repeatedly accused Tromelin-Lanuguy of "disgracing the flag", (Note: M. de Lanuguy, dont la manoeuvre était l'objet des plaisanteries des matelots, qui en ce genre n'ont pas la main légère, offrit son journal à M. de Suffren; et, quoiqu'on doive présumer qu'il eût cherché à y atténuer sa faiblesse, le général, discourant peu, louant en peu de mots et blâmant de même, lui dit de sa voix nasillarde, en le lui remettant le lendemain : « Eh bien! M. de Lanuguy, eh bien! je persiste à dire que vous avez entaché le pavillon ») but when he offered to resign, Suffren refused.

Tromelin-Lanuguy briefly commanded the 64-gun Saint-Michel from 18 May 1783 to 25 July, before returning to Pourvoyeuse.

=== Interwar ===
On 12 January 1784, Tromelin-Lanuguy married Marie Charlotte Julie Martin. That year, he took command of Osterley.

He was promoted to Major de vaisseau on 1 May 1786.

=== French Revolution ===
In 1790, Tromelin-Lanuguy requested a leave of absence from the Navy. He was then reported by a priest loyal to the Republic, and imprisoned. A friend convinced Jeanbon Saint-André to have him freed, and Tromelin-Lanuguy resigned from the Navy. He then requested permission to leave for Isle de France, but actually emigrated to join the Armée des Princes. The French Republic listed him as an émigré and his property was seized.

Tromelin-Lanuguy returned to France in 1797 before going to Copenhagen and embarking on the Danish East Indiaman Norge. He died aboard on 4 December 1798.

== See also ==
- Bernard-Marie Boudin de Tromelin (1735 — 1815), brother to Tromelin-Lanuguy
- Maurice Boudin de Tromelin de Launay (1740 — 1825), brother to Tromelin-Lanuguy
