= Maurice Jean Marie Boudin de Launay de Tromelin =

Maurice Jean Marie Boudin de Launay de Tromelin (Morlaix, 21 February 1740 – 1825) was a French Navy officer.

== Biography ==
Born to Marie-Françoise Le Diouguel de Penanru and Jacques Boudin de Tromelin, Tromelin-Lanuguy joined the Navy in 1756.

He served as first officer on Ardent under Charles de Bernard de Marigny, taking part in the Battle of the Chesapeake on 5 September 1781. This earned him status as a founding member of the Society of the Cincinnati. He was also a member of the Académie de Marine.

In 1792, during the French Revolution, he emigrated to England and joined the Armée des Princes.

At the Bourbon Restauration, he was made a Knight in the Order of Saint Louis. He eventually retired with the rank of Rear-Admiral.

== See also ==
- Bernard-Marie Boudin de Tromelin (1735–1815), brother to Tromelin-Launay
- Jacques Marie Boudin de Tromelin de La Nuguy (1751–1798), brother to Tromelin-Launay

== Sources and references ==
Bibliography

- Roche, Jean-Michel (2005). Dictionnaire des bâtiments de la flotte de guerre française de Colbert à nos jours. Vol. 1. Group Retozel-Maury Millau. ISBN 978-2-9525917-0-6. OCLC 165892922.
