= Cyclone Kamisy =

South-West Indian Ocean cyclone in 1984

Intense Tropical Cyclone Kamisy
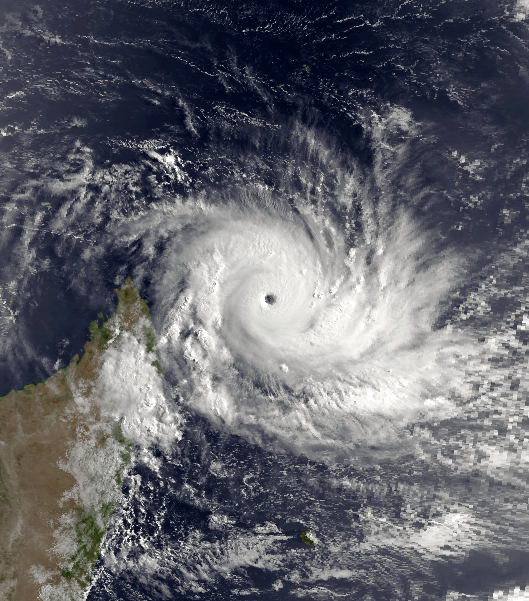
- Intense Tropical Cyclone Kamisy on 8 April

Meteorological history
- Formed: 3 April 1984
- Dissipated: 17 April 1984

Intense tropical cyclone
- 10-minute sustained (MFR)
- Highest winds: 170 km/h (105 mph)
- Lowest pressure: 927 hPa (mbar); 27.37 inHg

Category 3-equivalent tropical cyclone
- 1-minute sustained (SSHWS/JTWC)
- Highest winds: 185 km/h (115 mph)

Overall effects
- Fatalities: 69 total
- Damage: $250 million (1984 USD)
- Areas affected: Madagascar, Comoros, Mayotte, Seychelles
- IBTrACS
- Part of the 1983–84 South-West Indian Ocean cyclone season

Intense Tropical Cyclone Kamisy was considered the worst tropical cyclone to affect northern Madagascar since 1911. A tropical disturbance formed near Diego Garcia on 3 April 1984 and subsequently moved westward, intensifying into a moderate tropical storm two days later. Given the name Kamisy, the storm gradually intensified into an intense tropical cyclone by 9 April. Kamisy reached winds of 170 km/h (105 mph) before making landfall in extreme northern Madagascar near Diego Suarez. It weakened upon entering the Mozambique Channel, but briefly re-intensified on 10 April. That day while passing near Mayotte, the cyclone turned to the southeast, striking Madagascar again near Majunga. Kamisy quickly crossed the country. After emerging into the Indian Ocean off the east coast of Madagascar, the system reintensified into a moderate tropical storm before dissipating on 16 April.

In northern Madagascar, Kamisy produced wind gusts of 250 km/h (155 mph), which destroyed 80% of the city of Diego Suarez. About 39,000 people were left homeless in the area, and there were five deaths. In western Madagascar, the cyclone dropped 232.2 mm (9.14 in) of rainfall in 24 hours in Majunga, which damaged rice fields in the region after causing widespread river flooding. Additionally, the storm destroyed about 80% of Majunga. Throughout the country, Kamisy caused $250 million in damage and 68 deaths, with 215 people injured and 100,000 left homeless. Fifteen people were killed and 30 others were injured in Mahajanga. Following the storm, emergency food and medical supplies were rushed into the nation. In addition to the impact to Madagascar, one death and severe damage was reported in the Comoro Islands, where all of the banana crop was destroyed.

== Meteorological history ==
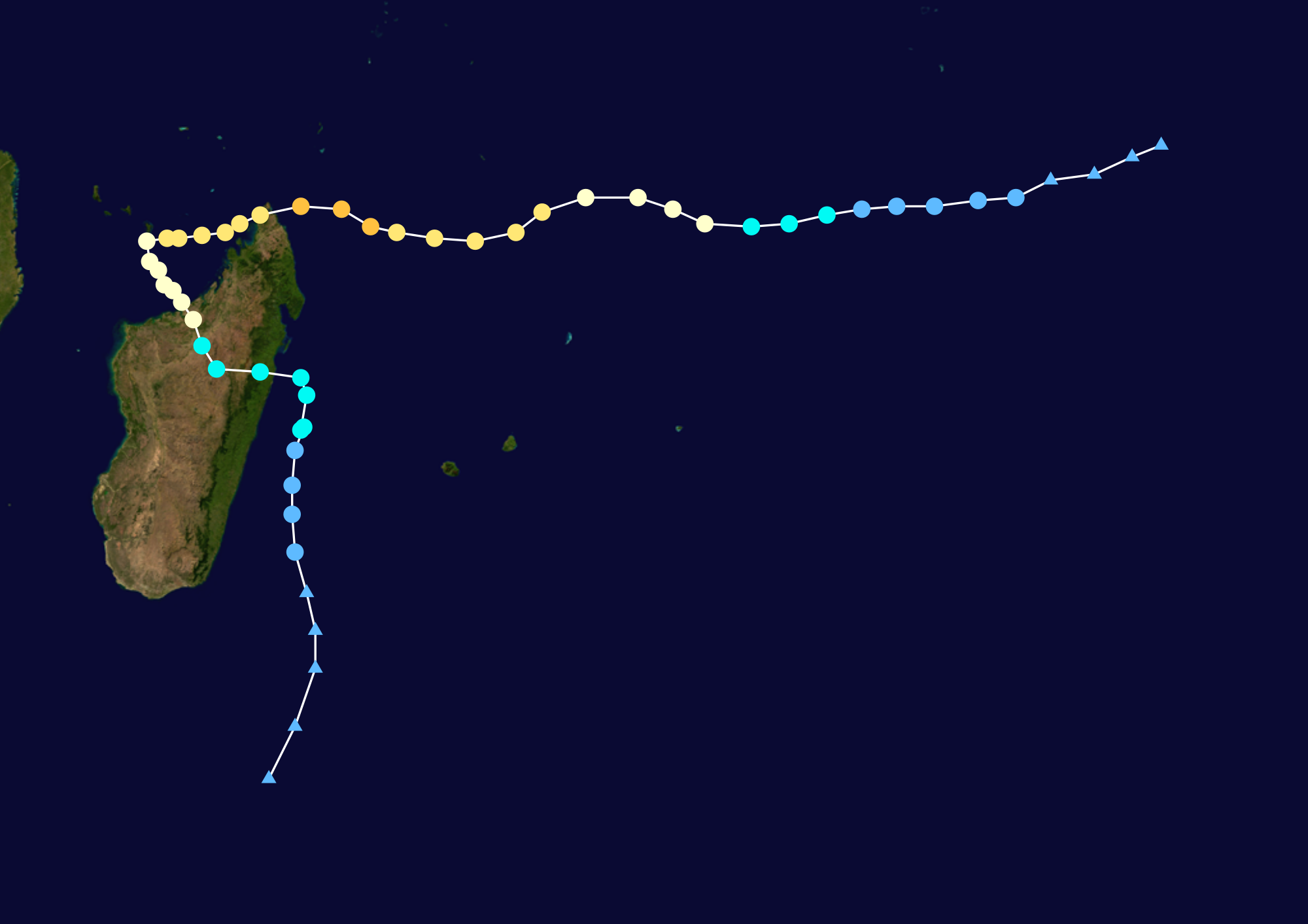
Map plotting the storm's track and intensity, according to the Saffir–Simpson scale Map key Saffir–Simpson scale Tropical depression (≤38 mph, ≤62 km/h) Tropical storm (39–73 mph, 63–118 km/h) Category 1 (74–95 mph, 119–153 km/h) Category 2 (96–110 mph, 154–177 km/h) Category 3 (111–129 mph, 178–208 km/h) Category 4 (130–156 mph, 209–251 km/h) Category 5 (≥157 mph, ≥252 km/h) Unknown Storm type Tropical cyclone Subtropical cyclone Extratropical cyclone, remnant low, tropical disturbance, or monsoon depression

Cyclone Kamisy originated from an area of convection that formed in early April. On 3 April, the system was assigned a Dvorak rating of T2.0 and was respectively upgraded into a moderate tropical storm by the Météo-France office on Reunion (MFR). However, the storm was not classified by the Joint Typhoon Warning Center (JTWC) until that evening. (Note: Wind estimates from Météo-France and most other basins throughout the world are sustained over 10 minutes, while estimates from the United States-based Joint Typhoon Warning Center are sustained over 1 minute. 10 minute winds are about 1.14 times the amount of 1 minute winds.) The storm initially tracked west-southwest, but after briefly weakening into a tropical depression, Kamisy began to turn west. On 5 April, the storm was upgraded into a moderate tropical storm for the second time; the JTWC followed suit and upgraded Kamisy into a tropical storm several hours later while located about 1,000 km (620 mi) west of Diego Garcia.

Kamisy steadily intensified and on 6 April, the JTWC reported that it attained hurricane-force winds despite MFR estimating winds of 80 km/h (50 mph). Early on 7 April, however, Kamisy was upgraded into a severe tropical storm as it had earned a rating of T4.0 on the Dvorak scale. Thereafter, the storm began to undergo rapid deepening. Later that day, the JTWC announced that Kamisy attained winds of 170 km/h (105 mph), equivalent to a mid-level Category 2 hurricane on the Saffir-Simpson Hurricane Wind Scale. Meanwhile, MFR upgraded the system into cyclone intensity. After briefly leveling off in intensity, the storm attained peak intensity of 170 km/h (105 mph) later that day. Early on 8 April, the JTWC estimated that it reached its peak intensity of 185 km/h (115 mph). Around this time, Kamisy was assigned a T6.0 rating via the Dvorak technique.

After maintaining peak intensity for less than a day, it weakened slightly. On 9 April, the storm brushed the northern Madagascar coast as a severe tropical storm, though the JTWC suggested that Kamsiy was considerably stronger. However, the afternoon to storm emerged into the extreme northern Mozambique Channel, where it passed near Mayotte, with little change in strength. After sharply turning south-southwest, Kamisy briefly regained tropical cyclone intensity, but resumed weakening as it approached the coast. While still a moderate tropical storm, it made landfall along the north-central part of the nation on 12 April, near Tamative. At the time of landfall, the JTWC noted that Kamisy was a minimal hurricane. The storm quickly weakened overland and was a tropical depression by the time it had emerged into the Indian Ocean. Shortly thereafter, the storm restrengthened into a moderate tropical storm, but this trend was short-lived. The JTWC downgraded Kamisy into a tropical depression at 06:00 UTC on 14 April. The agency issued the last warning on the system the following day, even though MFR kept tracking the system until the morning hours of 16 April. At this time, Kamisy was located about 500 mi (805 km) southwest of the southern tip of Madagascar.

== Impact ==
=== Madagascar ===
Throughout Madagascar, a total of 68 casualties were reported and 100,000 people were left homeless. Damage totaled to more than $250 million (1984 USD). Kamisy was considered the worst system to strike Madagascar since 1911. According to Relief Web, 7,000 buildings were at least partially destroyed, including 1,020 schools and 450 hospitals. Approximately 215 people were injured due to the storm. Overall, Kamisy was the strongest storm to hit the nation between 1980 and 1993.

In Diego Suarez, the storm caused significant damage, especially in residential areas. Warehouses, schools, and other public buildings suffered extensive damage. Throughout the city, 80% of the buildings were damaged and the town was 85% destroyed. Electrical and water supplies were cut in Diego Suarez. Nearby, in Befaria, a leprosarium, which housed 200 patients and their families, was damaged. The small village of Mangaoka was forced to move inland 100 m (330 ft). In Tamatave, a daily peak rainfall total of 294 mm (11.6 in) was measured, and 711 mm (28.0 in) fell in a six-day period. Due to the rainfall, 70% of the town's population moved to high ground. In Antsiranana, 30,000 of the 40,000 inhabitants were left homeless and were left with little food or water. Throughout northern Madagascar, about 39,000 people were left homeless in the area; there were five deaths.

After making its second landfall, 80% of the port of Mahajanga was destroyed, where 42,120 people were reportedly homeless. Many neighborhoods of the town, whose population was 45,000, were completed washed away. Many rice fields in the region were destroyed due to widespread river flooding. In Mahajanga alone, 15 people were killed while 30 others were majorly hurt. Several schools throughout the city were destroyed. Winds greater than 112 mph (180 km/h) were reported in Mahanjanga as well. Elsewhere, the town of Movoya was also mostly destroyed.

=== Elsewhere ===
After making its first landfall, the storm struck Mayotte, in the Comoros island group, where severe damage was recorded. One death was also reported. Dozens of others were severely hurt. Around 25,000 people were displaced. All of the banana and rice crop were destroyed by the storm in both Comoros and Seychelles.

== Aftermath ==
Following the storm, emergency food and medical supplies were rushed into the nation. Due to Madagascar's small budget, it did not have the resources to repair all the damage alone. Two French rescue mission, including one from Reunion, provided victims with food and medical assistance to Madagascar and Mayotte. Furthermore, the Malagasy Red Cross launched an appeal for blankets, clothes, tents, and medicine. The United States provided $25,000 in cash and $15,000 worth of other items. Moreover, Italy donated $41,500 to Madagascar. Netherlands provided $65,000 worth of supplies while the nations' the League of Red Cross and Red Crescent Societies decided to send a disaster team to the devastated area. The United Kingdom provided $74,000 is cash; France provided 2.2 short tons (2.0 t) of medicine, 500 short tons (450 t), and 4 tents. The government asked for 60,000 short tons (54,000 t) of rice, 5,000 short tons (4,500 t) of flour, 200 short tons (180 t) of edible oil, and 20 short tons (18 t) of milk and canned food. Aside from food items, they also asked for 20,000 short tons (18,000 t) of cement and 50,000 packages of iron sheets. Additionally, the head of Minister of State, Foreign and Commonwealth Office intended to focus on the reconstruction of bridges and roads. A private consulting company was later hired to conduct a post-storm assessment; a training program was subsequently launched, which had a budget of $3.5 million. The training program lasted until the 1985–86 South-West Indian Ocean cyclone season, when Cyclone Honorinina devastated the nation.

Sailors from the US Navy's warship USS Hector, were diverted to assist in the relief effort in Diego-Suarez, between April 23 and May 1, 1984. The warship was the first American naval vessel to visit the port after Madagascar's Government banned the superpowers including France and the United States from using it during the 1970s and were awarded two Humanitarian Service Medals. Amongst other assistance provided they restored the roof and power to the ports hospital and repaired the leprosarium at Befaria, near Diego-Suarez. Two French naval vessels also supplied brought food, medicine and other emergency supplies to help with the aftermath of the cyclone.

== See also ==
- Cyclone Geralda
- Tropical cyclones in the Comoros Islands

- Cyclone Chido – Another cyclone that followed a similar track and severely impacted Mayotte
