= Tromelin Island =

Disputed island in the Indian Ocean

Tromelin Island Île Tromelin (French)
- Flag of the French Southern and Antarctic Lands Coat of arms
- Motto: "Liberté, égalité, fraternité" (French) (English: "Liberty, equality, fraternity")
- Anthem: La Marseillaise ("The Marseillaise")
- Status: District of French Southern and Antarctic Lands
- Official languages: French

French Overseas Territory
  - Discovered by Jean Marie Briand de la Feuillée: 1722
  - French claim to sovereignty: 29 November 1776
- Currency: Euro (EUR)
- ISO 3166 code: TF
- Internet TLD: .tf

Tromelin Island
Disputed island
- Location of Tromelin and other Scattered Islands in the Indian Ocean
- Etymology: Jacques Marie Boudin de Tromelin de La Nuguy

Geography
- Location: Indian Ocean
- Coordinates: 15°53′32″S 54°31′29″E

Administration
- France
- Overseas territory: French Southern and Antarctic Lands
- District: Scattered Islands in the Indian Ocean

Claimed by
- Mauritius
- Outer Islands

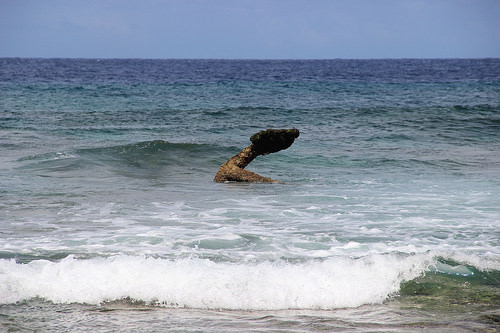
Anchor of the wrecked frigate Utile

Tromelin Island (/ˌtroʊmlɪn/; French: Île Tromelin, pronounced [il tʁɔmlɛ̃]), once called the Isle of Sand, is a low, flat island in the Indian Ocean about 500 km (310 mi; 270 nmi) north of Réunion and about 450 km (280 mi; 240 nmi) east of Madagascar. Both France and Mauritius claim sovereignty over the islands, and France includes it in the Scattered Islands in the Indian Ocean, the fifth district of the French Southern and Antarctic Lands.

Tromelin has facilities for scientific expeditions and a weather station. It is a nesting site for birds and green sea turtles.

== Etymology ==
The island is named in honour of Jacques Marie Boudin de Tromelin de La Nuguy, captain of the French corvette Dauphine. He arrived at the island on 29 November 1776, and rescued eight stranded enslaved Malagasy people who had been on the island for 15 years.

== Description ==
Map of Tromelin Island.

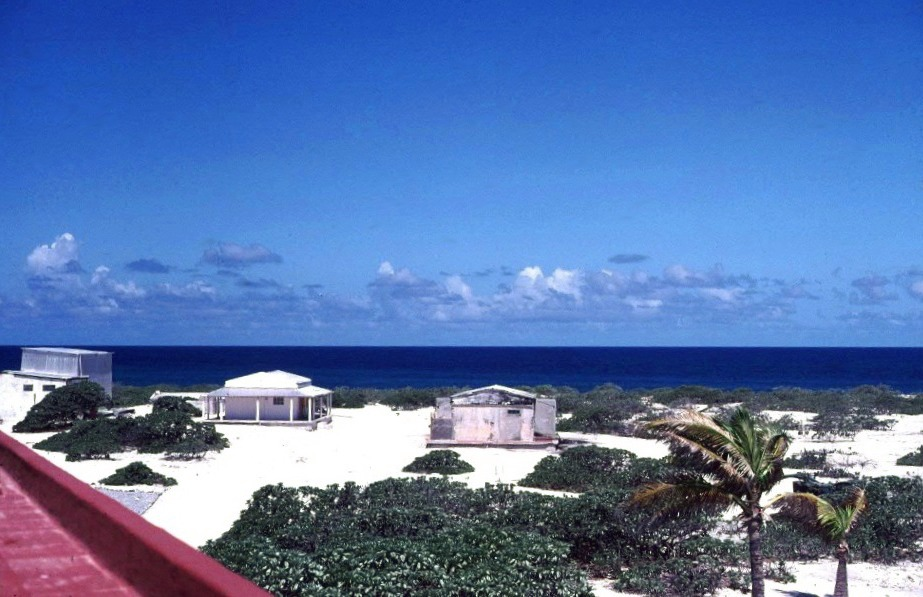
Present settlement on Tromelin Island.

Tromelin is situated in the Mascarene Basin and is part of the Îles Éparses. It is currently only 7 m (23 ft) high. It formed as a volcano, now eroded, and developed an atoll ring of coral.

Tromelin is about 1,700 m (1.1 mi) long and 700 m (0.43 mi) wide, with an area of 80 hectares (200 acres), covered in scrub dominated by octopus bush and surrounded by coral reefs. Access by sea is quite difficult as there are no harbours and the only anchorage, to the northwest of the island, is poorly situated. The best, but by no means ideal, landing area is on the east side of the northern peninsula. A 1,200-m (3,900-ft) airstrip provides a link with the outside world.

== Fauna and flora ==
Flora are poorly developed due to weather conditions and lack of fresh water. With the exception of two or three months in summer, this flat island is swept day and night by heavy winds that are sustained in winter. In summer, it can suffer the onslaught of cyclones and tropical storms.

There is only grass and brush (low shrubs) present on the island. Veloutaries (Heliotropium foertherianum) and purslane (Portulaca oleracea), with growth shaped by dominant east winds, are present everywhere on the island.

The fauna consist mainly of hermit crabs (Paguroidea), seabirds, and sea turtles for which the island is an important nesting place. The green turtle (Chelonia mydas) is mainly encountered and, to a lesser extent, the hawksbill sea turtle.

The waters are rich with fish. The French Coral Reef Initiative (IFRECOR) has identified 26 species of corals. Allochthonous species were introduced on the island during the various shipwrecks: rats, mice and rabbits. The latter were decimated in 1986 by cyclone Erinesta.

=== Important bird area ===
The island has been identified as an Important Bird Area (IBA) by BirdLife International because of its significance as a seabird breeding site. Both masked (with up to 250 pairs) and red-footed boobies (up to 180 pairs) nest on the island. Sulidae populations have seriously declined in the western Indian Ocean with those on Tromelin among the healthiest remaining.

The island's masked boobies are of the western Indian Ocean subspecies (Sula dactylatra melanops), of which Tromelin is a stronghold. The red-footed boobies constitute the only polymorphic population in the region, indicating its biogeographical isolation. Both great and lesser frigatebirds used to nest on the island. The breeding populations of both birds had been extirpated, though that has changed.

Invasive rats that arrived on Tromelin Island centuries ago with the wreck of a slave ship decimated the island's seabird population. By the time eradication efforts began in 2005, only two booby species remained. Despite the lack of any active restoration actions after the eradication of rats, and the remoteness of the island, 17 years after rat eradication, the seabird community increased from two to seven breeding species, and from 353 to 4758 breeding pairs (total for all species).

Unlike seabirds, there are no resident landbirds on Tromelin Island.

== History ==
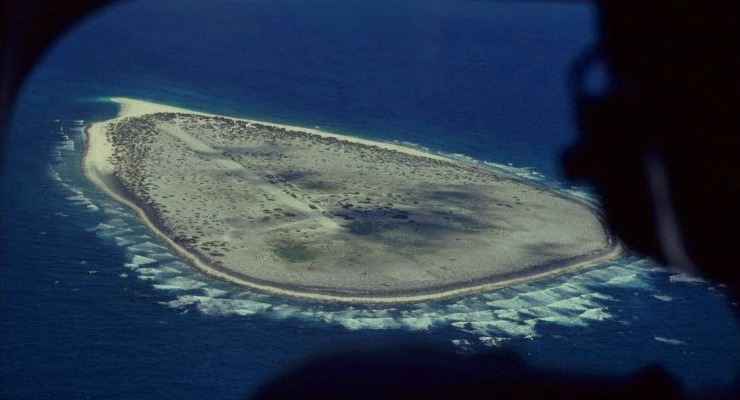
Aerial view

The island was discovered by France in the 1720s. It was recorded by the French navigator Jean Marie Briand de la Feuillée and named Île de Sable ("Isle of Sand").

=== Wreck of the ship Utile ===
On 31 July 1761 the French ship Utile ("Useful"), a frigate of the French East India Company, chartered by Jean-Joseph de Laborde and commanded by Captain Jean de La Fargue, transporting slaves from Madagascar to Mauritius in contravention of Mauritian law, ran onto the reefs of the island. The ship had departed Bayonne in France with 142 men. After a stopover on Mauritius (then called the Isle de France), the ship embarked 160 Malagasy men, women, and children at Foulpointe, on the east coast of Madagascar, to bring them into slavery on Mauritius, despite the prohibition of trafficking decreed by the governor. A navigation error, due to the use of two conflicting charts, caused the vessel to wreck on the reefs of Tromelin Island (then called the Isle of Sand). The ship was a frigate, not a slave ship, and thus was not equipped with the shackles and chains usually found on slave ships.

After the wreck, the crew and about 60 Malagasy people managed to reach the island, but the rest of the slaves, locked in the hold, drowned. The crew retrieved various equipment, food and wood from the wreckage. They dug a well, providing drinking water, and fed on salvaged food, turtles, and seabirds.

Captain Jean de Lafargue lost his mind as a result of the wreck, and was replaced by his first lieutenant, second-in-command, Barthelemy Castellan du Vernet who lost his brother Leon in the shipwreck. Castellan built two camps, one for the crew and one for the slaves, a forge and an oven, and with the materials recovered from the wreckage, began construction of a boat. On 27 September 1761, a contingent of 122 French sailors (crew and officers) left Tromelin aboard the newly built boat, Providence. They left the surviving slaves – 60 Malagasy men and women – on the desert island, promising to return and rescue them.

The sailors reached Madagascar in just over four days and, after a stopover in Foulpointe, where men died of tropical diseases, were transferred to Réunion Island (then named Bourbon Island), and then to Mauritius (then called the Isle de France). When the crew of the ship reached Mauritius, they requested that colonial authorities send a ship to rescue the Malagasy slaves on the island. However, they met with a categorical refusal from the governor, Antoine Marie Desforges-Boucher, with the justification that France was fighting the Seven Years' War and thus no ship could be spared, the island of Mauritius being itself under threat of attack from British India.

Castellan left Mauritius (Isle de France) to return to France in 1762 and never gave up hope to one day return to the Isle of Sand to save the Malagasy people. The news of the castaway slaves got published and stirred the Parisian intellectual milieu; later, the episode was all but forgotten with the end of the Seven Years' War and the bankruptcy of the East India Company.

In 1773, a ship passing close to Tromelin Island located the slaves and reported them to the authorities of Isle de France. A boat was sent, but this first rescue failed, as the ship could not approach the island. A year later, a second ship, Sauterelle, also failed to reach the island. During this second failed rescue, a sailor managed to swim to the island, but he had to be abandoned by the ship due to bad weather. This sailor remained on Tromelin Island and, some time later, probably around 1775, built a raft on which he embarked with three men and three women, but which disappeared at sea.

It was not until 29 November 1776, 15 years after the sinking, that Ensign Tromelin-Lanuguy, captain of the corvette Dauphine, reached Tromelin Island and rescued the survivors – seven women and an eight-month-old child. Upon arriving there, Tromelin-Lanuguy discovered that the survivors were dressed in plaited feather clothes and that they had managed, during all these years, to keep a fire lit (the island did not have a single tree). The Malagasy people, who had been left on the bleak little island, built a shed with coral stones, for most of the wood had been used in the construction of the raft for the crew. They also built a lookout on the highest point of the island in order not to miss the ship that would, they hoped, come to their rescue. They were all from the Central Highlands of Madagascar, and had no knowledge of how to produce food in the coastal environment. Most had died within the first few months on the island. The survivors remained with Jacques Maillart, governor of Mauritius (Isle de France), who declared them free and offered to bring them back to Madagascar, which they refused. Maillart decided to baptize the child Jacques Moyse (Moses), on the day of his arrival in Port-Louis on 15 December 1776, and to rename his mother Eve (her Malagasy name was Semiavou) and to do the same with the child's grandmother, whom he called Dauphine after the name of the corvette that rescued them. The trio was welcomed in the house of the intendant of Mauritius (Isle de France). Tromelin was the first to precisely describe the island that now bears his name.

In 1781, the Marquis de Condorcet recounted the tragedy of the castaways of Tromelin, to illustrate the inhumanity of the slave trade, in his book Reflections on the Slavery of Negroes advocating the abolition of slavery.

=== Expedition "Forgotten Slaves" ===
An archaeological expedition entitled "Forgotten Slaves", led by Max Guérout, a former French naval officer and director of operations of the Naval Archaeology Research Group, and Thomas Romon, archaeologist at INRAP (National Institute for Preventive Archaeological Research), took place from October to November 2006, under the patronage of UNESCO and the French Committee for the History and Remembrance of Slavery (CPMHE). The results of the research were made public on 17 January 2007. The ten members of the expedition probed the wreck of Utile, and searched the island for traces of shipwreck, in order to better understand the living conditions of the Malagasy people during these fifteen years. According to Max Guérout, head of the mission, "In three days, a well 5 metres [16.5 feet] deep was dug. This represented a considerable effort. We found many bones of birds, turtles, and fish. One does not have the impression that these people were crushed by their condition. They tried to survive with order and method."

An anonymous logbook, attributed to a writer of the crew, was found. Basements made of beach sandstone and coral were also found. The survivors thus transgressed a Malagasy custom, according to which stone constructions were reserved for tombs. There were also six copper bowls and a pebble used to sharpen knives. The fire was maintained for fifteen years, thanks to the wood from the wreck, the island being devoid of trees.

A second expedition, organized in November 2008, did not reveal the burials observed in 1851 by an English naval officer. However, the remains of two bodies displaced during the digging of the foundations of a building of the weather station were uncovered. Three buildings built with coral blocks were discovered, including the kitchen, which was still equipped with kitchen utensils, and in particular copper containers that had been repaired several times, testifying to the Malagasy's determination to survive.

A third archaeological mission took place in November 2010. It allowed the discovery of three new buildings and many objects, including two tinder lighters and flints, which showed how the castaways managed to relight the fire.

The fourth expedition took place in September–October 2013. It lasted for 45 days, and identified many tools and shelters, as well as the layout of the site.

In 2016, an exhibition presenting the results of the various excavation campaigns, entitled "Tromelin, the island of forgotten slaves", was presented jointly in metropolitan France and in the DROM: At the Stella Matutina Museum in Saint-Leu (La Réunion), the castle of the Dukes of Brittany in Nantes, the House of Agglomeration of Lorient, the Aquitaine Museum in Bordeaux, the departmental museum of archaeology and prehistory of Martinique in Fort-de-France, and finally to the Basque Museum of the History of Bayonne from June to November 2017.

=== Sovereignty claims ===
Tromelin is administered as part of the French Southern and Antarctic Lands, a French Overseas Territory, but Mauritius claims sovereignty over the island despite its absence in the listing of the 8th article of the 1814 Treaty of Paris. Indeed, the treaty does not specifically mention all the dependencies of Mauritius, which leads to uncertainty on the sovereignty of Tromelin, and the official text was that written in French. During the British period of Mauritius, France administered the island as a dependency of the region of Réunion and built infrastructure without British protest. France and Mauritius have been negotiating for years in regard to the possible establishment of a condominium on the island. In 2010, Mauritius and France reached an agreement on the co-management of Tromelin, without prejudice to the sovereignty of Mauritius over it.

The French claim to sovereignty dates from 29 November 1776, the date that the ship Dauphine arrived.

The Mauritian claim to sovereignty is based on the fact that the island must have been ceded to United Kingdom by the treaty of Paris in 1814 and should not continue to be administered by France as a dependency of Réunion.

The United Nations has never recognized Mauritian sovereignty over Tromelin. In 1954, France constructed a meteorological station and a landing strip on the island.

It is a matter of dispute whether the building agreement transferred sovereignty of Tromelin from one to the other, and Mauritius claims the island as part of its territory, on the grounds that France did not retain its sovereignty over the island in 1814, which was, de facto, part of the colony of Mauritius at the time of independence. Indeed, as early as 1959, even before independence, Mauritius informed the World Meteorological Organization that it considered Tromelin to be part of its territory. A co-management treaty was reached by France and Mauritius in 2010, but has not been ratified.

The Scattered Islands in the Indian Ocean are partially claimed by the Comoros, Madagascar, and Mauritius. The Malagasy and Mauritian claims, however, are significantly later than their access to independence. However, the agreement reached in October 2024 on the restitution to Mauritius of the Chagos Islands by Great Britain, in the heart of the Indian Ocean, notably home to the American base of Diego Garcia, has relaunched the debate in Madagascar.

Tromelin has an Exclusive Economic Zone (EEZ) of 280,000 km^{2} (108,109 sq mi), contiguous with that of Réunion. The island's autonomous weather station, which warns of cyclones, is still operated by France and is supported by personnel from the French Southern and Antarctic Lands (TAAF). Staff are rotated every three months through resupply missions mounted from Réunion.

== Climate ==
Tromelin Island has a tropical savanna climate (Köppen climate classification Aw). The average annual temperature in Tromelin is 26.7 °C (80.1 °F). The average annual rainfall is 1,073.7 mm (42.27 in) with February as the wettest month. The temperatures are highest on average in February, at around 28.7 °C (83.7 °F), and lowest in August, at around 24.3 °C (75.7 °F). The highest temperature ever recorded in Tromelin was 36.3 °C (97.3 °F) on 1 January 1983; the coldest temperature ever recorded was 17.4 °C (63.3 °F) on 12 July 1964.

Climate data for Tromelin Island (1991–2020 averages, records 1955–present)
Month	Jan	Feb	Mar	Apr	May	Jun	Jul	Aug	Sep	Oct	Nov	Dec	Year
Record high °C (°F)	36.3 (97.3)	34.9 (94.8)	34.4 (93.9)	33.3 (91.9)	31.6 (88.9)	30.0 (86.0)	28.5 (83.3)	28.8 (83.8)	29.6 (85.3)	31.7 (89.1)	33.8 (92.8)	33.9 (93.0)	36.3 (97.3)
Mean daily maximum °C (°F)	31.2 (88.2)	31.3 (88.3)	31.0 (87.8)	30.3 (86.5)	29.1 (84.4)	27.4 (81.3)	26.4 (79.5)	26.6 (79.9)	27.1 (80.8)	28.2 (82.8)	29.5 (85.1)	30.7 (87.3)	29.1 (84.4)
Daily mean °C (°F)	28.6 (83.5)	28.7 (83.7)	28.6 (83.5)	28.0 (82.4)	26.9 (80.4)	25.3 (77.5)	24.3 (75.7)	24.3 (75.7)	24.7 (76.5)	25.7 (78.3)	26.9 (80.4)	28.1 (82.6)	26.7 (80.1)
Mean daily minimum °C (°F)	26.0 (78.8)	26.2 (79.2)	26.1 (79.0)	25.7 (78.3)	24.7 (76.5)	23.1 (73.6)	22.1 (71.8)	22.0 (71.6)	22.3 (72.1)	23.2 (73.8)	24.3 (75.7)	25.5 (77.9)	24.3 (75.7)
Record low °C (°F)	20.5 (68.9)	22.3 (72.1)	20.9 (69.6)	20.8 (69.4)	19.5 (67.1)	18.1 (64.6)	17.4 (63.3)	17.8 (64.0)	18.0 (64.4)	18.2 (64.8)	19.6 (67.3)	20.5 (68.9)	17.4 (63.3)
Average precipitation mm (inches)	136.0 (5.35)	185.9 (7.32)	155.1 (6.11)	142.7 (5.62)	68.5 (2.70)	60.3 (2.37)	69.2 (2.72)	48.4 (1.91)	50.0 (1.97)	31.8 (1.25)	42.7 (1.68)	83.1 (3.27)	1,073.7 (42.27)
Average precipitation days (≥ 1.0 mm)	12.9	14.0	14.2	13.0	10.4	11.2	13.6	11.4	10.1	7.4	6.1	9.4	133.6
Source: Météo France
