= List of islands by name (A) =

This article features a list of islands sorted by their name beginning with the letter A.

== A ==
| Island's Name | Island group(s) | Country/Countries |
|---|---|---|
| 83-42 | | Greenland, Denmark |
| A Nova | Beira Baixa islands | Portugal |
| Abbasak | Persian Gulf | Iran |
| Aberdeen | Georgian Bay, Ontario | Canada |
| Abner Cay | Bahamas | Bahamas |
| Abruka | Gulf of Riga | Estonia |
| Absecon | New Jersey | United States |
| Abu Musa | Persian Gulf | Claimed by Iran and United Arab Emirates |
| Acheron | Great Palm Island, Queensland | Australia |
| Achill | | Ireland |
| Achillbeg | | Ireland |
| Acklins | Bahamas | Bahamas |
| Acton | Lake Muskoka, Ontario | Canada |
| Adam | Lesser Antilles | Grenada |
| Adams | Antarctica | |
| Adams | Massachusetts | United States |
| Adams | Auckland Islands | New Zealand |
| Adams | Nunavut | Canada |
| Adams Key | Florida Keys, Florida | United States |
| Adderly Cay | Bahamas | Bahamas |
| Adelaide | Marguerite Bay off the west coast of the Antarctic Peninsula | Antarctica |
| Adelaide | St. Lawrence River, Ontario | Canada |
| Adelsö | Lake Mälaren | Sweden |
| Adhelfopoulo | Sporades | Greece |
| Admiralty | Alaska | United States |
| Admiralty | Nunavut | Canada |
| Admiralty | Saint Lawrence River, Ontario | Canada |
| Adsiz | Baku Archipelago | Azerbaijan |
| Æbelø | The Kattegat | Denmark |
| Aegina | Saronic Islands | Greece |
| Aegna | Tallinn Bay, Baltic Sea | Estonia |
| Ærø | Baltic Sea | Denmark |
| Agar's | Bermuda | United Kingdom |
| Agathonisi | Dodecanese | Greece |
| Agatti | Lakshadweep | India |
| Agerø | Limfjord | Denmark |
| Agersø | Great Belt | Denmark |
| Agios Efstratios | | Greece |
| Agnes | Queensland | Australia |
| Agolada | Ribatejo islands | Portugal |
| Agrihan | Northern Mariana Islands | United States |
| Agunijima | Okinawa Islands part of the Ryukyu Islands | Japan |
| Ahe | King George Islands, Tuamotus, French Polynesia | France |
| Ahelaid | Väinameri Sea | Estonia |
| Cayo Ahogado | Greater Antilles,Puerto Rico | United States |
| Ahtra | Pärnu Bay, Gulf of Riga | Estonia |
| Ailinginae | Ralik Chain | Marshall Islands |
| Ailinginae Atoll | Ralik Chain | Marshall Islands |
| Ailinglapalap | Ralik Chain | Marshall Islands |
| Ailinglapalap Atoll | Ralik Chain | Marshall Islands |
| Ailuk | Ratak Chain | Marshall Islands |
| Ailuk Atoll | Ratak Chain | Marshall Islands |
| Air Force | Queen Elizabeth Islands, Nunavut | Canada |
| Aipus | Torres Strait Islands Queensland | Australia |
| Aitutaki | Cook Islands | Cook Islands |
| Ajeltokrok | Arno Atoll | Marshall Islands |
| Ajirah | Hawar Islands | Bahrain |
| Akajima | Kerama Islands part of the Okinawa Islands part of the Ryukyu Islands | Japan |
| Akimiski | James Bay, Nunavut | Canada |
| Akpatok | Queen Elizabeth Islands, Nunavut | Canada |
| Aksi | Gulf of Finland | Estonia |
| Akusekijima | Tokara Islands part of the Satsunan Islands part of the Ryukyu Islands | Japan |
| Aikin | Alabama | United States |
| Al Hajiyat | Hawar Islands | Bahrain |
| Al Wakur | Hawar Islands | Bahrain |
| Alameda | Islands of San Francisco Bay, California | United States |
| Åland | Archipelago Sea, Åland Islands | Finland |
| Albany | Torres Strait Islands Queensland | Australia |
| Albatross | Tasmania | Australia |
| Isla de Alborán | Plazas de Soberanía, Strait of Gibraltar | Disputed between Spain and Morocco |
| Alcarraza | Greater Antilles, Puerto Rico | United States |
| Alcatraz | Islands of San Francisco Bay, California | United States |
| Alcorn | Moon Lake, Mississippi | United States |
| Alcsi-sziget | Tisza | Hungary |
| Alder Cay | Bahamas | Bahamas |
| Alderney | Channel Islands | (United Kingdom) Crown dependency |
| Alegranza | Canary Islands | Spain |
| Alejandro Selkirk | Juan Fernández archipelago | Chile |
| Alexander | Queen Elizabeth Islands, Nunavut | Canada |
| Cayo Alfenique | Greater Antilles, Puerto Rico | United States |
| Alger | Fulton Chain Lakes, New York | United States |
| Cayo Algodones | Greater Antilles, Puerto Rico | United States |
| Alicudi | Aeolian Islands | Italy |
| Alimia | Dodecanese | Greece |
| All Awash | Lesser Antilles | Saint Vincent and the Grenadines |
| Allan Cays | Bahamas | Bahamas |
| Allans Cay | Bahamas | Bahamas |
| Alligator | Alabama | United States |
| Allirahu | Gulf of Riga | Estonia |
| Allison | Torres Strait Islands, Queensland | Australia |
| Almourol | Ribatejo islands | Portugal |
| Alnön | | Sweden |
| Alonissos | Sporades | Greece |
| Alpha | Bermuda | United Kingdom |
| Als | Baltic Sea | Denmark |
| Alumine Vaika | Vaika Islands | Estonia |
| Isla Altamuria | Sinaloa | Mexico |
| Alty | Delaware | United States |
| Amager | Øresund | Denmark |
| Amami Ōshima | Amami Islands part of the Satsunan Islands part of the Ryukyu Islands | Japan |
| Amanu | Tuamotus, French Polynesia | France |
| Ambae | Pacific Ocean | Vanuatu |
| Ambergris Cay | Bahamas | Bahamas |
| Amboyna Cay | Spratly Islands | Disputed between: China, Republic of China, Vietnam, Brunei, Philippines, and Malaysia |
| Ambrym | New Hebrides | Vanuatu |
| Ambu | Arabian Sea | India |
| Amedroz | North Channel, Ontario | Canada |
| Ameland | West Frisian Islands | Netherlands |
| Amelia | Sea Islands, Florida | United States |
| Amherst | Lake Ontario, Ontario | Canada |
| Amini | Lakshadweep | India |
| Ammerön | | Sweden |
| Amores | Minho islands | Portugal |
| Amorgos | Cyclades | Greece |
| Amoroso | Beira Litoral Islands | Portugal |
| Åmøy | Stavanger Municipality, Rogaland | Norway |
| Amrita | Massachusetts | United States |
| Amrum | North Frisian Islands | Germany |
| Amsterdam | Indian Ocean | France |
| Amund Ringnes Island | Sverdrup Islands group of the Queen Elizabeth Islands, Nunavut | Canada |
| Amygdaloid | Lake Superior, Michigan | United States |
| Anacapa | Channel Islands of California | United States |
| Anafi | Cyclades | Greece |
| Anastasia | Matanzas River, Florida | United States |
| India | Bay of Bengal | India |
| Anatahan | Northern Mariana Islands | United States |
| Anaho | Pyramid Lake, Nevada | United States |
| Anatom | Pacific Ocean | Vanuatu |
| Anchor | Torres Strait Islands, Queensland | Australia |
| Andaman and Nicobar Islands | Bay of Bengal | India |
| Andalusia | Mississippi River, Illinois | United States |
| Anderson Cay | Bahamas | Bahamas |
| Anderson's Ledge | Isles of Shoals, New Hampshire | United States |
| Anderson | Puget Sound, Washington | United States |
| Andørja | Troms | Norway |
| Andøya | Vesterålen | Norway |
| Andrott | Lakshadweep | India |
| Andros | Cyclades | Greece |
| Andros | Bahamas | Bahamas |
| Anegada | Lesser Antilles, British Virgin Islands | United Kingdom |
| Angel Cays | Bahamas | Bahamas |
| Isla Ángel de la Guarda | Baja California | Mexico |
| Angel | Islands of San Francisco Bay, California | United States |
| Angijak | Nunavut | Canada |
| Agistri | | Greece |
| Angle Cay | Bahamas | Bahamas |
| Angoche | | Mozambique |
| Anglesey | North Wales | Wales |
| Anguila | Bahamas | Bahamas |
| Anguilla | Leeward Islands of the Lesser Antilles | British Overseas Territory of the United Kingdom |
| Anguillita | Leeward Islands of the Lesser Antilles, Anguilla | British Overseas Territory of the United Kingdom |
| Anholt | the Kattegat | Denmark |
| Aniwa | Pacific Ocean | Vanuatu |
| Anjouan | Comoros | Comoros |
| Anna Cay | Bahamas | Bahamas |
| Annacis | Fraser River, British Columbia | Canada |
| Annobón | Gulf of Guinea | Equatorial Guinea |
| Anticosti | Saint Lawrence River, Quebec | Canada |
| Antigua | Leeward Islands | Antigua and Barbuda |
| Antikythera | | Greece |
| Antelope | Arizona | United States |
| Antelope | Great Salt Lake, Utah | United States |
| Antiparos | Cyclades | Greece |
| Antipsara | | Greece |
| Anuanuraro | Duke of Gloucester Islands, Tuamotus, French Polynesia | France |
| Anuanurunga | Duke of Gloucester Islands, Tuamotus, French Polynesia | France |
| Anuta | Melanesia | Solomon Islands |
| Anydros | Cyclades | Greece |
| Aoba | Pacific Ocean | Vanuatu |
| Aogashima | Izu Islands | Japan |
| Apataki | Palliser Islands, Tuamotus, French Polynesia | France |
| Aplin | Queensland | Australia |
| Appledore | Isles of Shoals, Maine | United States |
| Aquidneck | Aquidneck Island, Rhode Island | United States |
| Aragusuku | Yaeyama Islands part of the Sakishima Islands part of the Ryukyu Islands | Japan |
| Aranysziget | Tisza | Hungary |
| Araura | Cook Islands | Cook Islands |
| Araway Cay | Bahamas | Bahamas |
| Arbuckle | Arkansas | United States |
| Archer | Arkansas | United States |
| Archers Cay | Bahamas | Bahamas |
| Arden | Torres Strait Islands, Queensland | Australia |
| Ardy More | Lower Lough Erne | Ireland |
| Cayo Arenas | Greater Antilles, Puerto Rico | United States |
| Argyle | Lake Huron, Ontario | Canada |
| Ari | Maldives | Maldives |
| Ariana | Alentejo Islands | Portugal |
| Aristazabal | British Columbia | Canada |
| Arizona | Wyoming | United States |
| Arkiko | Red Sea | Eritrea |
| Arkoi | Dodecanese | Greece |
| Armathia | Dodecanese | Greece |
| Armona Island | Algarve islands | Portugal |
| Armstrong | Holston River, Tennessee | United States |
| Arnold | Queensland | Australia |
| Arnøya | Troms | Norway |
| Årø | Little Belt | Denmark |
| Arøya | Vestfold | Norway |
| Arran | Scotland | Scotland |
| Arranmore | County Donegal | Ireland |
| Arsenal | Mississippi River, Illinois | United States |
| Aruba | Lesser Antilles | Kingdom of the Netherlands |
| Aruro | Lake Abaya | Ethiopia |
| Arutua | Palliser Islands, Tuamotus, French Polynesia | France |
| Ascension | | (United Kingdom) British overseas territory of Saint Helena, Ascension and Tristan da Cunha |
| Ascrib | | Scotland |
| Ash | Willamette River, Oregon | United States |
| Asinara | Sardinia | Italy |
| Askø | | Denmark |
| Asperö | Southern Gothenburg Archipelago | Sweden |
| Assateague | Maryland and Virginia | United States |
| Astakida | Dodecanese | Greece |
| Astipálaia | Dodecanese | Greece |
| Asunción | Northern Mariana Islands | United States |
| Atholl | Bahamas | Bahamas |
| Atiu | Cook Islands | Cook Islands |
| Atkinson | Galveston Bay, Texas | United States |
| Atløyna | Vestland | Norway |
| Attu | Aleutian Islands | United States |
| Atwood Cay | Bahamas | Bahamas |
| Aubrey | St. Lawrence River, Ontario | Canada |
| Aubussi | Torres Strait Islands, Queensland | Australia |
| Auckland | Auckland Islands | New Zealand |
| Aughinish | County Clare | Ireland |
| Aughinish | County Limerick | Ireland |
| August Cay | Bahamas | Bahamas |
| Auhah | Persian Gulf | Kuwait |
| Aukane | Torres Strait Islands, Queensland | Australia |
| Aulneau | St. Lawrence River, Ontario | Canada |
| Aur Atoll | Ratak Chain | Marshall Islands |
| Aureed | Torres Strait Islands, Queensland | Australia |
| Auskerry | The North Isles, Orkney Islands | Scotland |
| Australia | Australia, Australia | Australia |
| Austvågøy | Lofoten | Norway |
| Aux Herbes | Mississippi Sound, Alabama | United States |
| Avernakø | | Denmark |
| Averøya | Møre og Romsdal | Norway |
| Avery | Louisiana | United States |
| Avsa | Sea of Marmara | Turkey |
| Axel Heiberg | Sverdrup Islands group of the Queen Elizabeth Islands, Nunavut | Canada |
| Azenha Brava | Alentejo islands | Portugal |

== See also ==
- List of islands (by country)
- List of islands by area
- List of islands by population
- List of islands by highest point
