= 1991–92 South Pacific cyclone season =

Tropical cyclone season

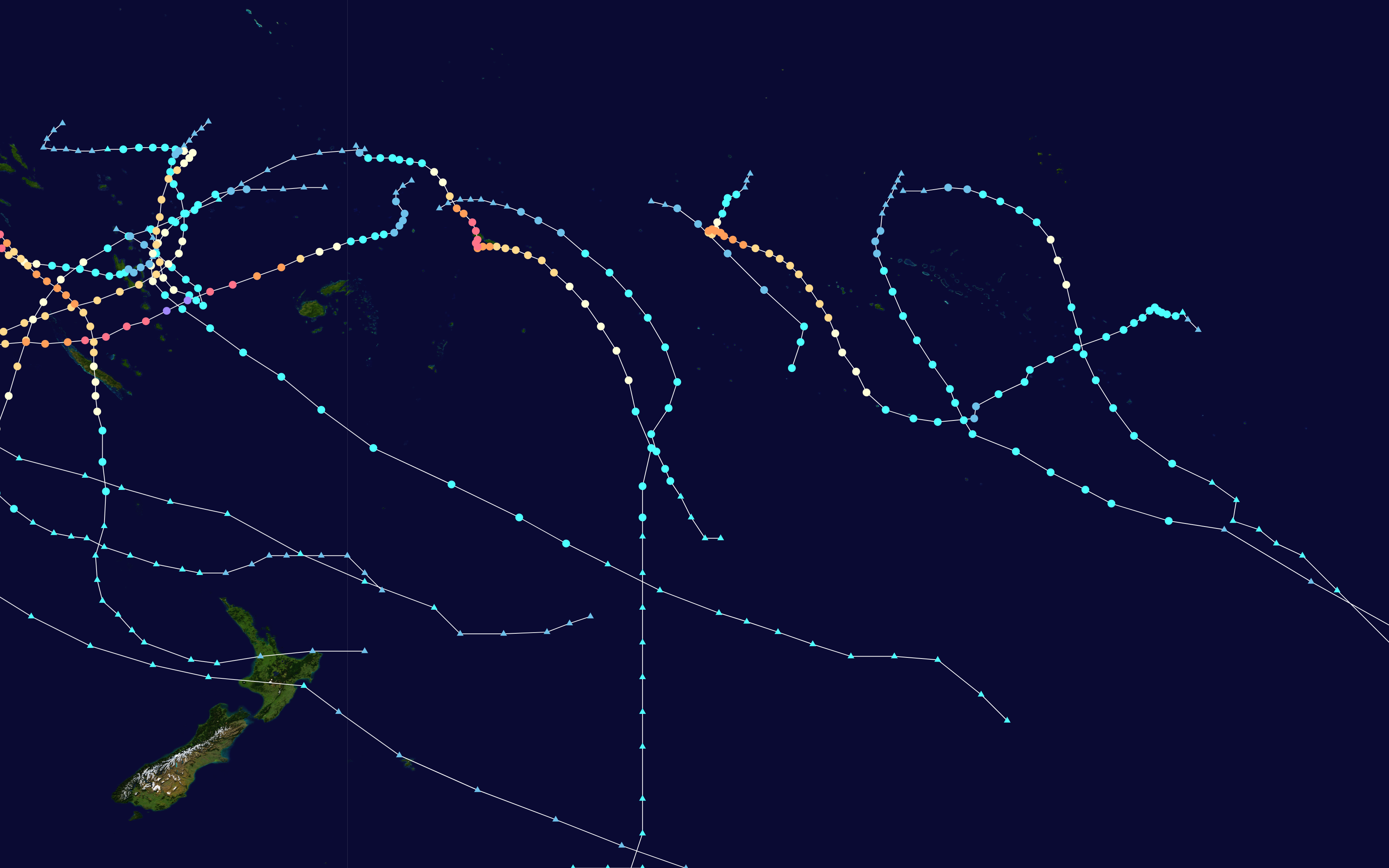
- Season summary map

Seasonal boundaries
- First system formed: November 13, 1991
- Last system dissipated: May 2, 1992

Strongest storm
- Name: Fran
  - Maximum winds: 205 km/h (125 mph) (10-minute sustained)
  - Lowest pressure: 920 hPa (mbar)

Seasonal statistics
- Total depressions: 14
- Tropical cyclones: 11
- Severe tropical cyclones: 7
- Total fatalities: 21
- Total damage: ≥ $360 million (1992 USD)

Related articles
- 1991–92 South-West Indian Ocean cyclone season; 1991–92 Australian region cyclone season

The 1991–92 South Pacific cyclone season was an above average tropical cyclone season, with eleven tropical cyclones occurring within the South Pacific basin between 160°E and 120°W. The first tropical cyclone of the season was first noted on November 13, 1991, while the last tropical cyclone dissipated on May 2, 1992. During the season at least 21 people were killed by tropical cyclones, while Tropical Cyclones Cliff and Innis were the only tropical cyclones not to cause any damage to any country in the Southern Pacific.

During the season, tropical cyclones were monitored by the Tropical Cyclone Warning Centers (TCWC) in Nadi, Fiji, and in Wellington, New Zealand. (Note: The FMS, or RSMC Nadi, warns on systems in the South Pacific located from the Equator to 25°S and from 160°E to 120°W. The New Zealand MetService, or TCWC Wellington, warns on systems from 25°S to 40°S and from 160°E to 120°W) Whilst tropical cyclones that moved or formed to the west of 160°E were monitored as a part of the Australian region by the Australian Bureau of Meteorology. Both the United States Joint Typhoon Warning Center (JTWC) and the Naval Western Oceanography Center (NWOC) issued unofficial warnings within the southern Pacific. The JTWC issued warnings between 160°E and the International Date Line whilst the NWOC issued warnings for tropical cyclones forming between the International Date Line and the coasts of the Americas. Both the JTWC and the NWOC designated tropical cyclones with a number and a P suffix with numbers assigned in order to tropical cyclones developing within the whole of the South Pacific. The FMS and MetService both use the Australian Tropical Cyclone Intensity Scale, and measure windspeeds over a period of ten minutes, while the JTWC and the NWOC measured sustained winds over a period of one minute which are compared to the Saffir–Simpson hurricane wind scale.

== Seasonal summary ==
During the season, a significant increase in the amount of tropical cyclones occurring within the South Pacific basin was observed, with eleven tropical cyclones occurring within the basin during the season compared to three during the previous season. This increase was attributed to a mature El Niño episode, that had started developing towards the end of the previous season. During the season the major areas of tropical cyclogenesis were shifted eastwards, from their mean position towards the more central parts of Pacific.

The first tropical cyclone of the season was first noted as a tropical depression on November 13, before it was named Tia during November 16, after it had become a category 1 tropical cyclone on the Australian tropical cyclone intensity scale. Over the next day the system rapidly intensified into a category 3 severe tropical cyclone and affected the Solomon Islands of Tikopia and Anuta while near its peak intensity. Tia subsequently started to weaken during November 19, as it became the first of six tropical cyclones to affect Vanuatu during the season.

After Severe Tropical Cyclone's Val and Wasa-Arthur, the South Pacific Convergence Zone gradually moved back to its near-normal position between the Samoan Islands, Southern Cook Islands and French Polynesia's Austral Islands.

The names: Tia, Val, Wasa, Betsy, Esau and Fran were later retired from the tropical cyclone naming lists. On July 1, 1992, the New Zealand Meteorological Service was split in two and became the Meteorological Service of New Zealand and the National Institute of Water and Atmospheric Research.

== Systems ==
=== Severe Tropical Cyclone Tia ===
- Category 3 severe tropical cyclone (Australian scale)
- Category 2 tropical cyclone (SSHWS)
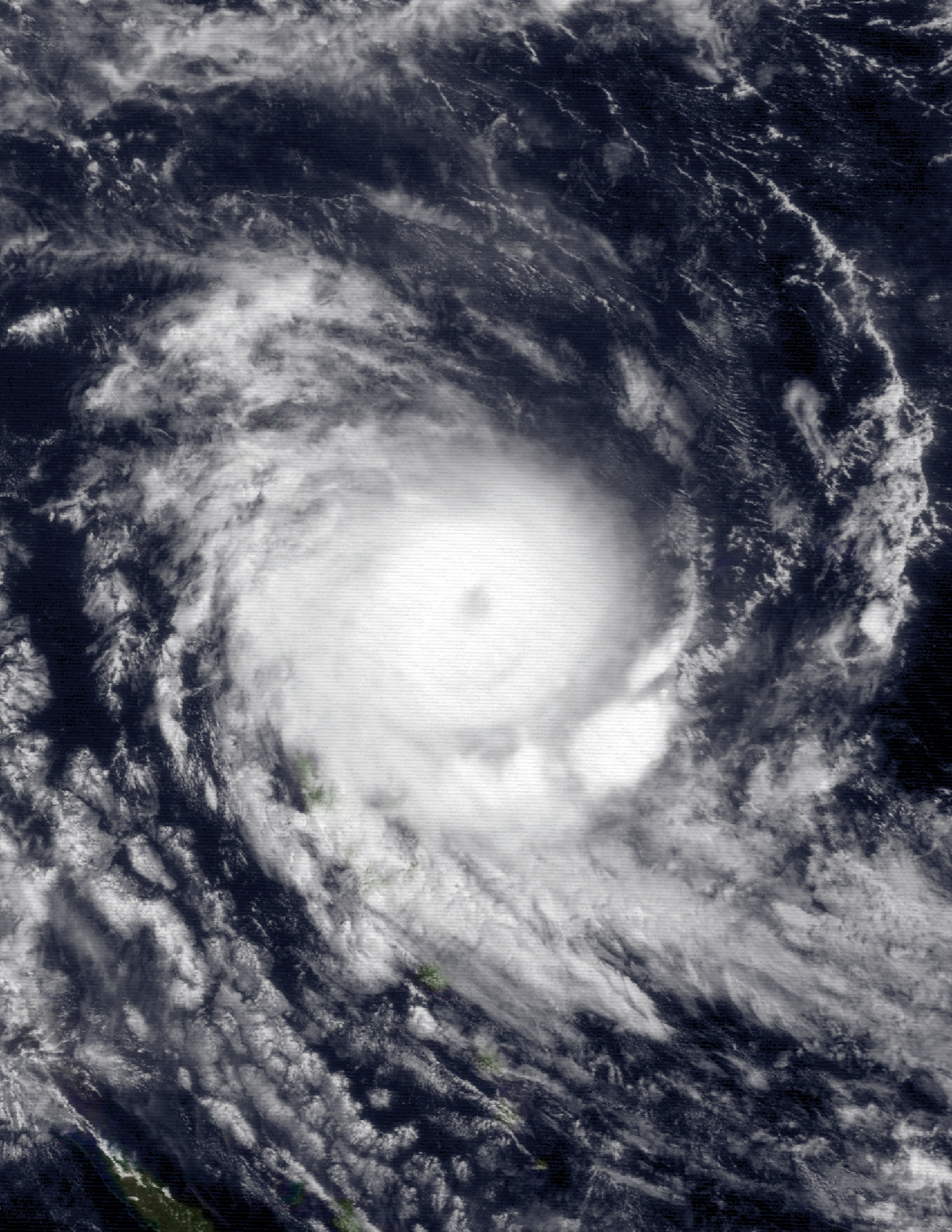
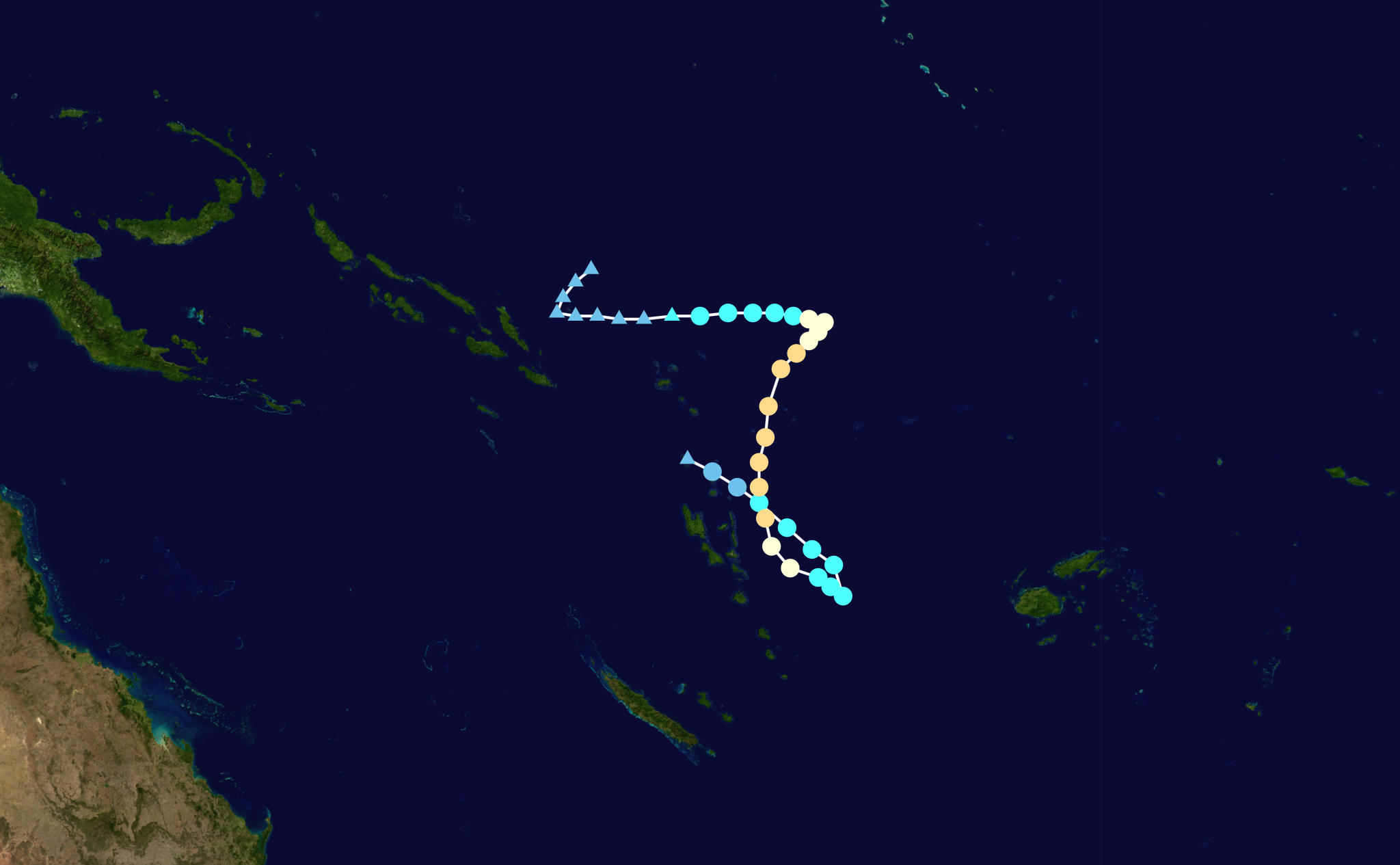
- Duration: November 13 – November 21
- Peak intensity: 140 km/h (85 mph) (10-min); 960 hPa (mbar)

On November 13, the FMS started to monitor a tropical depression that had developed within the South Pacific Convergence Zone, to the northeast of the Solomon Islands. Over the next few days, the system gradually developed further within an area of light winds in the upper troposphere, before the JTWC initiated advisories and designated it as Tropical Cyclone 03P early on November 15. During that day the system's upper-level outflow characteristics became more favourable for further development, before the FMS named the system Tia early the next day after it had developed into a Category 1 tropical cyclone. Later that day because of a developing northerly steering current, the system slowed down and undertook a small anticlockwise loop before starting to move towards the southwest and rapidly intensify. After rapidly intensifying throughout November 16 and 17, Tia passed within 55 km (35 mi) of Anuta Island at around 1800 UTC on November 17, before passing near Tikopia Island six hours later. As Tia moved near Tikopia, the FMS reported that the system had reached its peak intensity as a category 3 severe tropical cyclone with 10-minute sustained windspeeds of 140 km/h (85 mph). During November 18, Tia started to gradually weaken under the influence of cooler sea surface temperatures and strengthening vertical windshear, while it moved southwards under the influence of a strengthening upper level northerly wind flow. Over the next 24 hours, the system continued to move southwards and passed within 150 km (95 mi) of Vanuatu's Banks Islands, while gradually weakening further. Tia subsequently degenerated into a tropical depression during November 20, before it was last noted during the next day, as it crossed a part of its former track where it had been producing hurricane-force windspeeds a few days earlier.

Apart from extensive damage on the Solomon Islands of Anuta and Tikopia which directly lay in Tia's path, the overall effect of the cyclone was minimal. More than 1000 people were left homeless on Tikopia, after 90% of all dwellings were completely destroyed while the remaining 10% had either walls destroyed or roofs blown off. The cyclone also destroyed seven of the eight church buildings and all but one of the classroom buildings belonging to the two primary schools while food crops were completely destroyed with all coconut trees either blown down or uprooted. High seas and waves caused extensive damage to the coasts and flooded low-lying areas, salinating food crops such as taro and destroyed the water supply system on the island. As a result, Tikopia was declared a disaster area by the Solomon Islands National Disaster Council. Sustained windspeeds of 133 km/h (85 mph), wind gusts of 133 km/h (85 mph) and a minimum pressure of 987.9 hPa (30 inHg) were all reported by the automatic weather station on Anuta. Within Vanuatu the damage was mainly confined to fruit trees within the Banks and Torres Island Groups, while minor damage was reported to some old houses on Ambae, Epi and Tongoa Islands. On the Bank island of Mota, one man was slightly injured by flying corrugated iron while a church building was flattened.

=== Severe Tropical Cyclone Wasa–Arthur ===
- Category 4 severe tropical cyclone (Australian scale)
- Category 3 tropical cyclone (SSHWS)
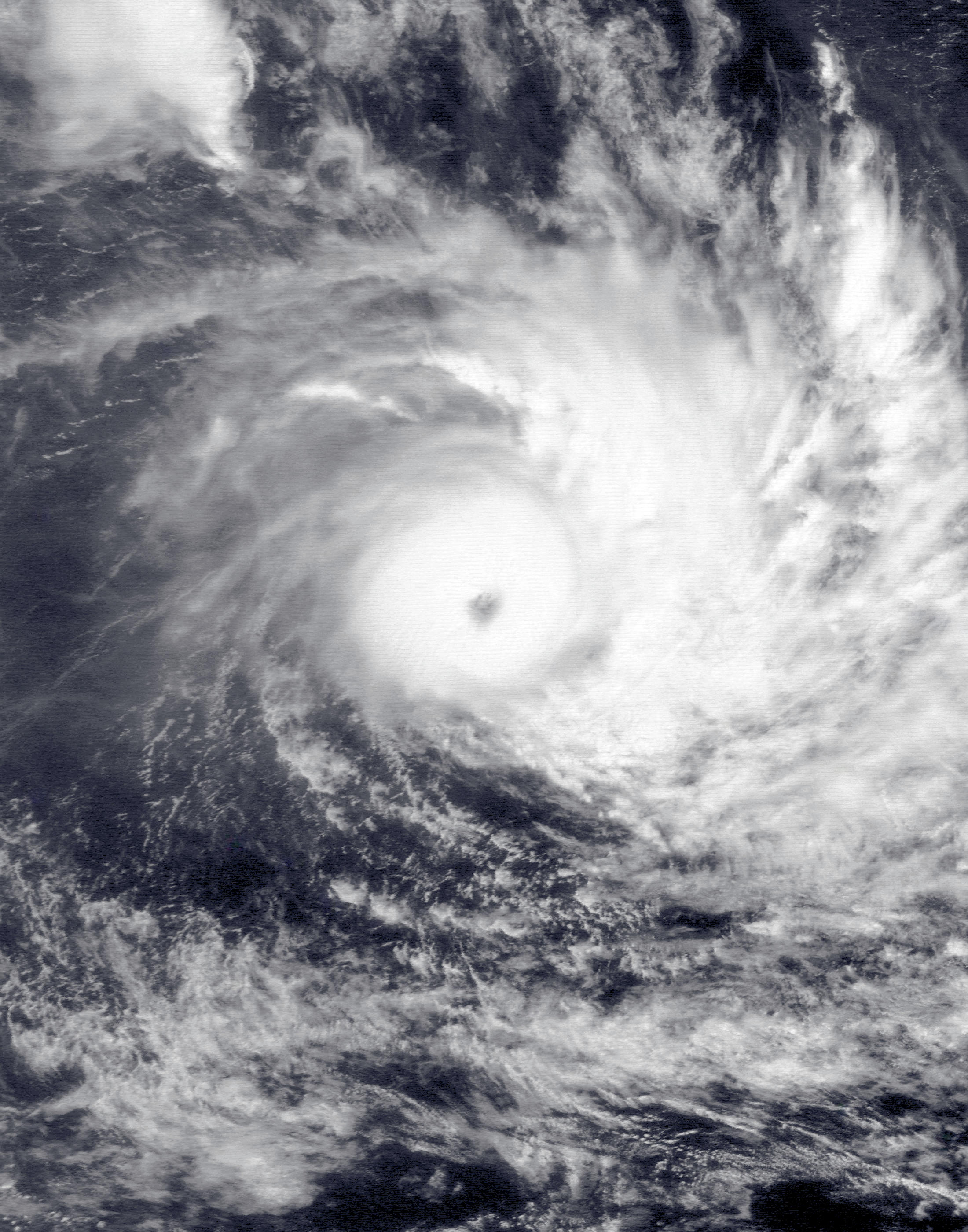
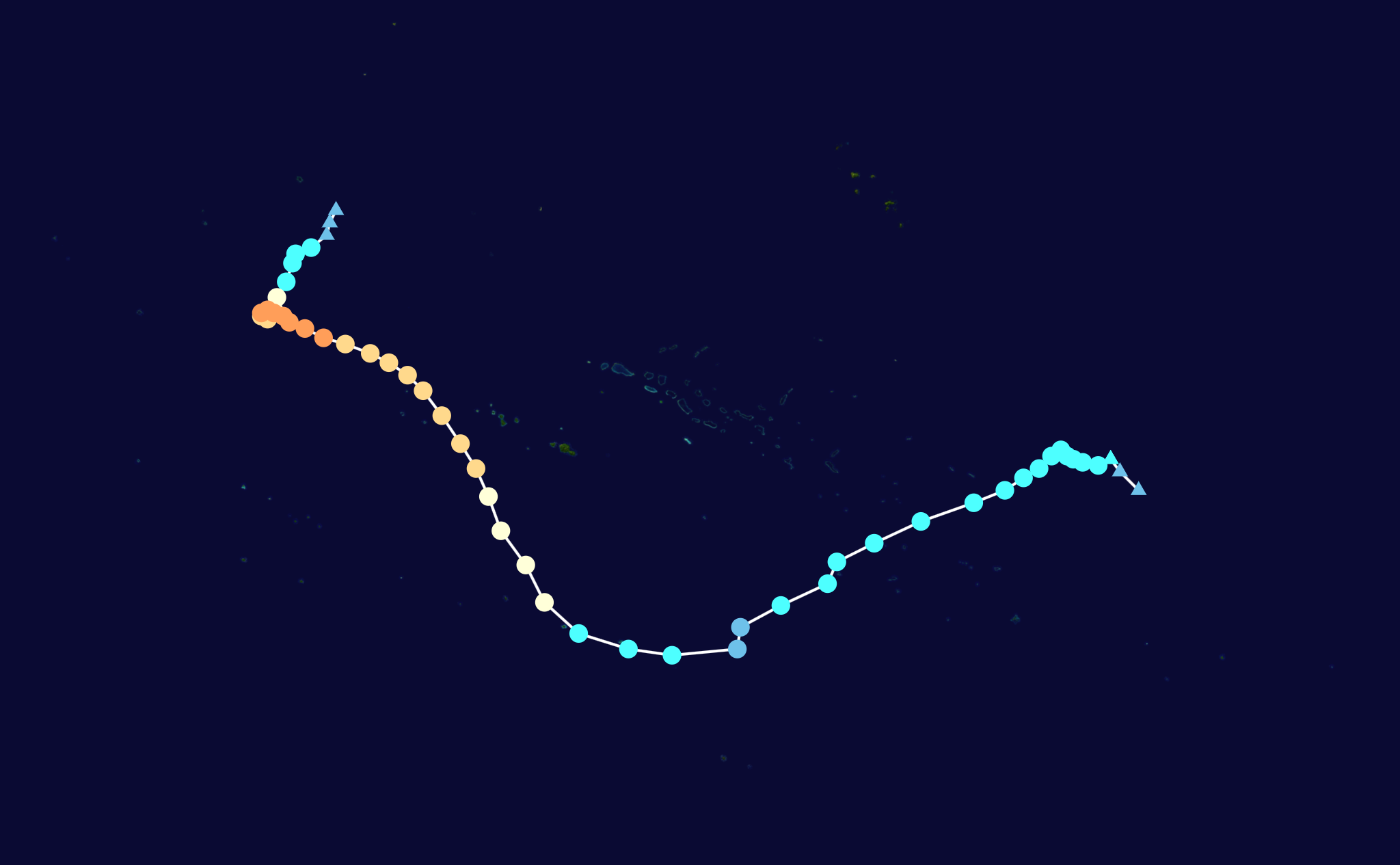
- Duration: December 3 – December 16
- Peak intensity: 165 km/h (105 mph) (10-min); 940 hPa (mbar)

On December 3, the FMS started to monitor a shallow tropical depression was embedded within a monsoon trough of low pressure over the Northern Cook Islands. Over the next couple of days, the system gradually developed further as it moved south-westwards, before the NWOC and the FMS reported that the depression had developed into Tropical Cyclone Wasa during December 5. After it had been named, Wasa slowed down and made a small cyclonic loop as it continued to intensify and became a category 3 severe tropical cyclone during December 7.

Early on December 8, the NWOC reported that Wasa had peaked with 1-minute sustained windspeeds of 195 km/h (120 mph), which made it equivalent to a category 3 hurricane on the SSHWS. The next day, the FMS estimated peak 10-minute winds of 165 km/h (105 mph), making Wasa a Category 4 severe tropical cyclone. Over the next few days, the system weakened into a tropical depression after passing through the Society and Austral Islands. The NWOC issued their final advisory on Wasa on December 13, as the system turned northeastward to warmer waters. Later that day, Wasa became sufficiently organized to be reclassified as a category 1 tropical cyclone by the FMS, who renamed it Arthur. Over the next 24 hours, Arthur passed about 80 mi (130 km) north-northwest of Mururoa, which reported winds of 70 km/h (45 mph). On December 14, the FMS reported that Wasa-Arthur had reached its secondary peak intensity of 130 km/h (80 mph). The cyclone maintained this intensity while moving eastward through the uninhabited Acteon Group of islands and other atolls. On December 15, the NWOC classified it as Tropical Cyclone 08P, with peak 1-minute winds of 85 km/h (55 mph). On December 16, the system gradually weakened into a shallow depression, and both the FMS and the NWOC issued their final advisories on Wasa-Arthur.

On December 9, ahead of Cyclone Wasa affecting French Polynesia, the High Commissioner Jean Montpezat declared a state of maximum alert which closed schools and banned navigation. On December 12, tourists on the island of Bora Bora were evacuated to a local church, after the system had swept high seas into tourist bungalows. Overall Cyclone Wasa-Arthur caused an estimated US$60 million in damage within the six Leeward Islands, the two Windward Islands of Tahiti and Moorea and several of the Austral Islands with the majority of the damage done between December 9 – 12. The system destroyed 367 homes, damaged 855 other homes, destroyed or damaged a variety of crops and damaged several public buildings, hotels, roads and power installations, with the worst affected islands were Bora Bora and Tubuai. On Rurutu island, Moerai harbour was destroyed by a cyclonic swell generated by the system, while the local school and police station were destroyed by high waves. A woman and her child were killed while asleep after torrential rainfall from the system caused a mudslide on the island of Moorea, during a night of torrential rain the day after Wasa had made its closest approach to the island.

=== Severe Tropical Cyclone Val ===
- Category 4 severe tropical cyclone (Australian scale)
- Category 4 tropical cyclone (SSHWS)
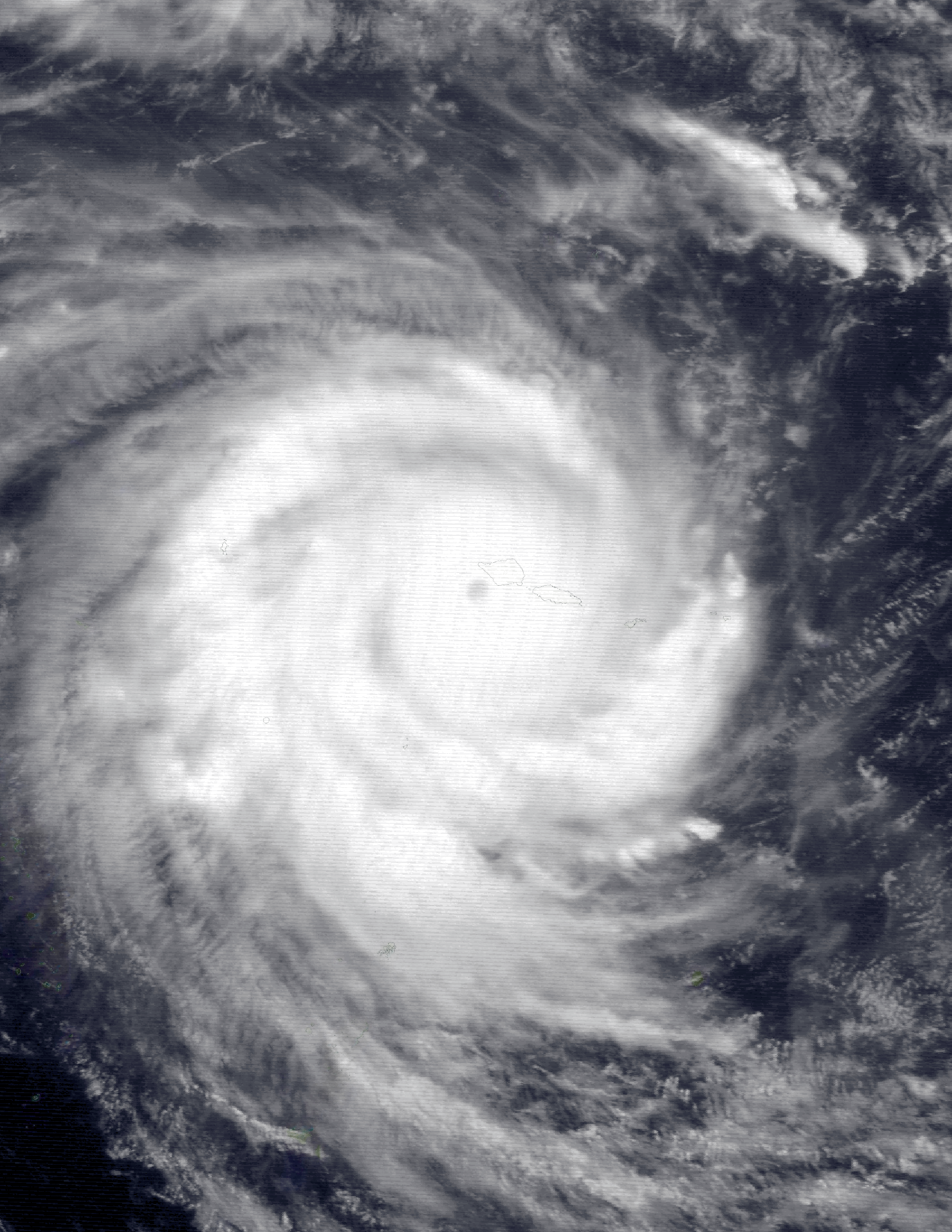
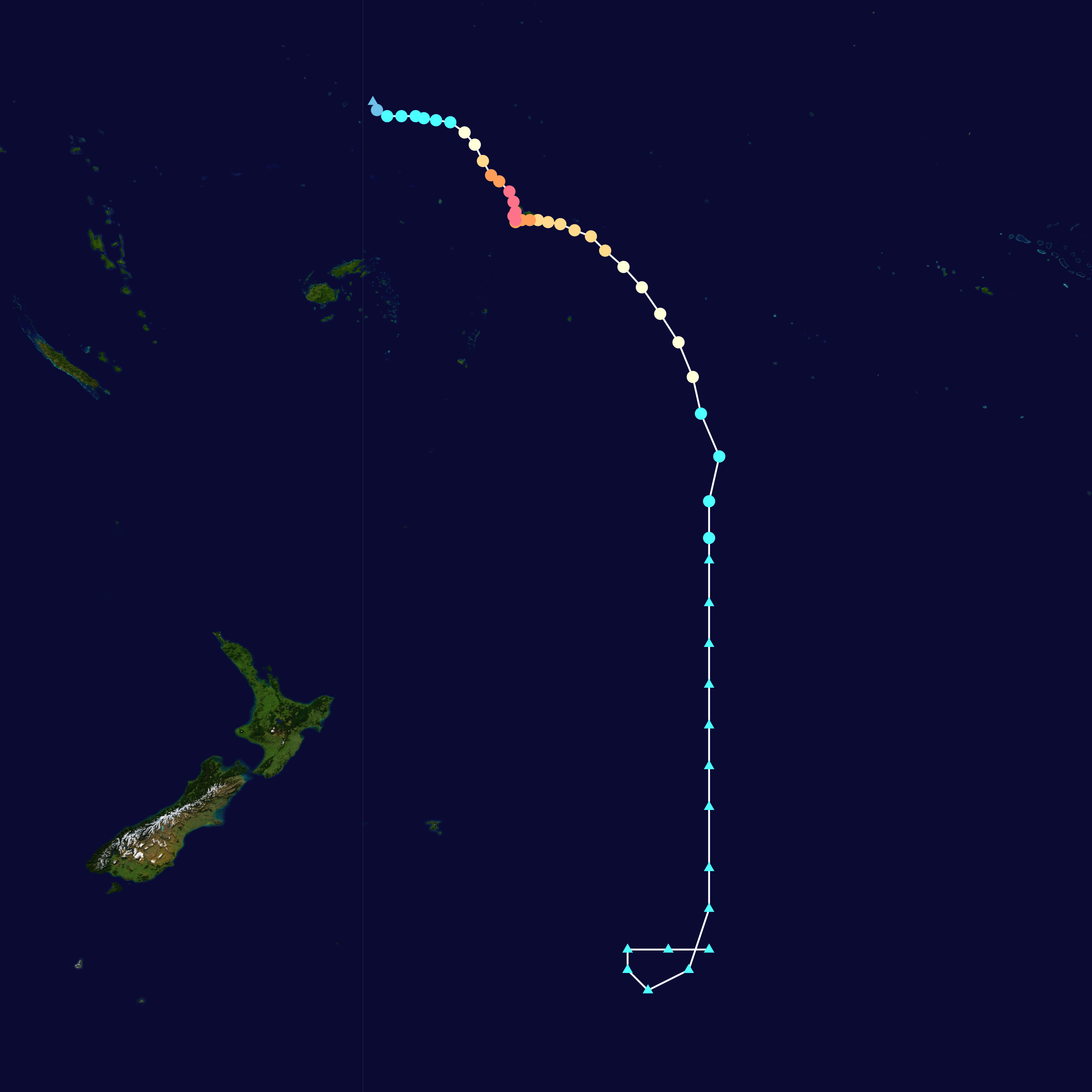
- Duration: December 4 – December 17
- Peak intensity: 165 km/h (105 mph) (10-min); 940 hPa (mbar)

Early on December 4, the FMS started to monitor a small tropical depression, that had developed along the Intertropical Convergence Zone just to the southeast of Tuvalu. During that day the system moved towards the northeast and steadily developed further with the FMS naming it Val early the next day, after it had become a category 1 tropical cyclone on the Australian tropical cyclone intensity scale. During that day the NWOC designated the system as Tropical Cyclone 06P and started to issue advisories, while Val started to move towards the south-southeast after the upper level north-westerly steering winds had increased. Over the next two days the system gradually intensified as it moved south-eastwards towards Western Samoa before the FMS reported late on December 7, that Val had peaked as a category 4 severe tropical cyclone with 10-minute sustained windspeeds of about 165 km/h (105 mph). The system subsequently made landfall later that day on the Western Samoan island of Savaii, before the NWOC reported that the cyclone had peaked with 1-minute sustained windspeeds of about 230 km/h (145 mph), which made it equivalent to a category 4 hurricane on the SSHS. After Val had passed over the island weakening upper-level winds and caused the system to slow down, before it started to move erratically and made a sharp clockwise loop which almost brought it over Savaii for a second time.

The cyclone lasted for five days in American Samoa and was designated by the United States Government as a major disaster on December 13, 1991. Western Samoa suffered more damage than American Samoa. The cyclone devastated the islands with 150-mile-per-hour (240 km/h) winds and 50-foot (15 m) waves. The overall damages caused by Cyclone Val in American Samoa have been variously assessed. One estimate put the damages at $50 million in American Samoa and $200 million in Western Samoa due to damage to electrical, water, and telephone connections and destruction of various government buildings, schools, and houses.

=== Severe Tropical Cyclone Betsy ===
- Category 4 severe tropical cyclone (Australian scale)
- Category 2 tropical cyclone (SSHWS)
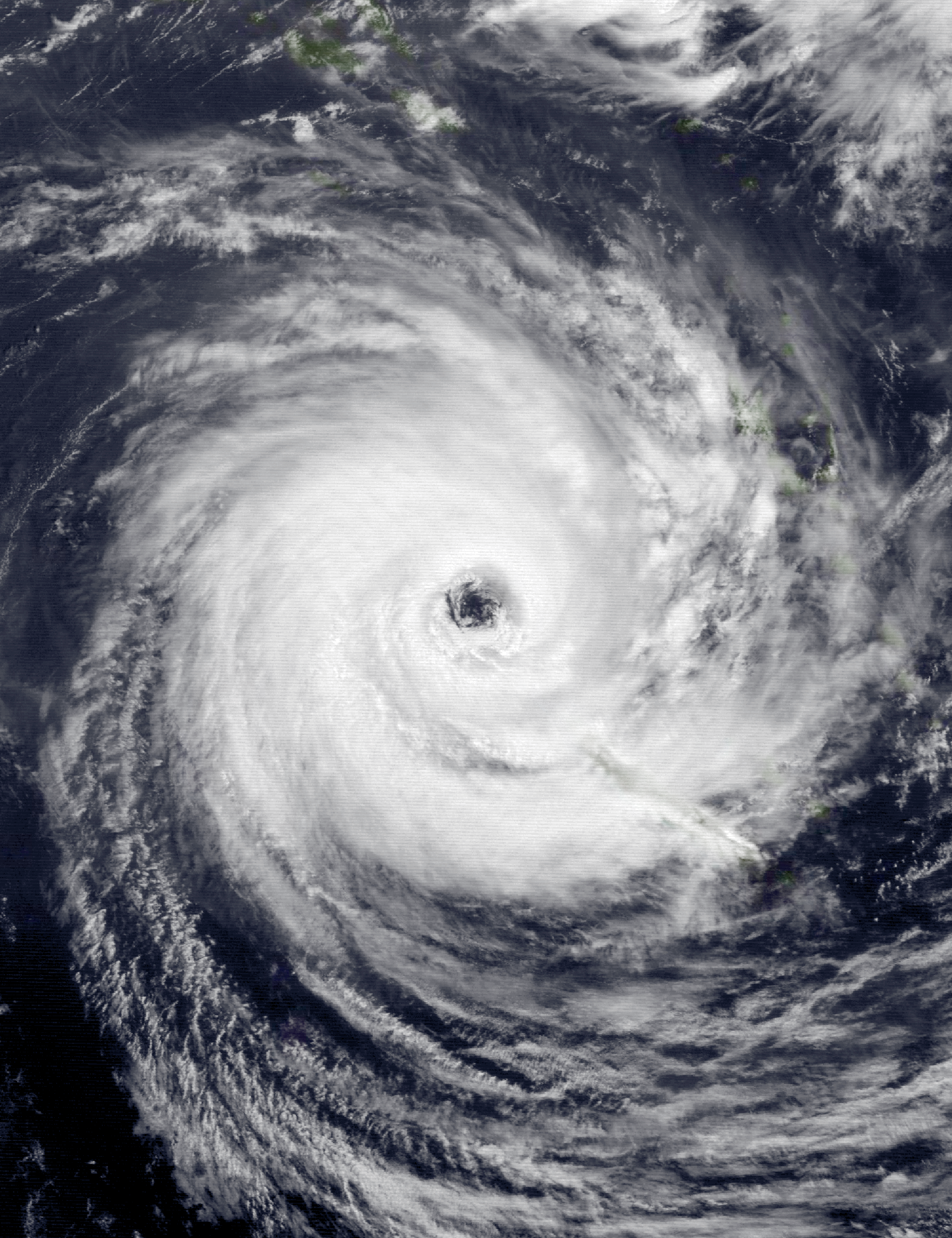
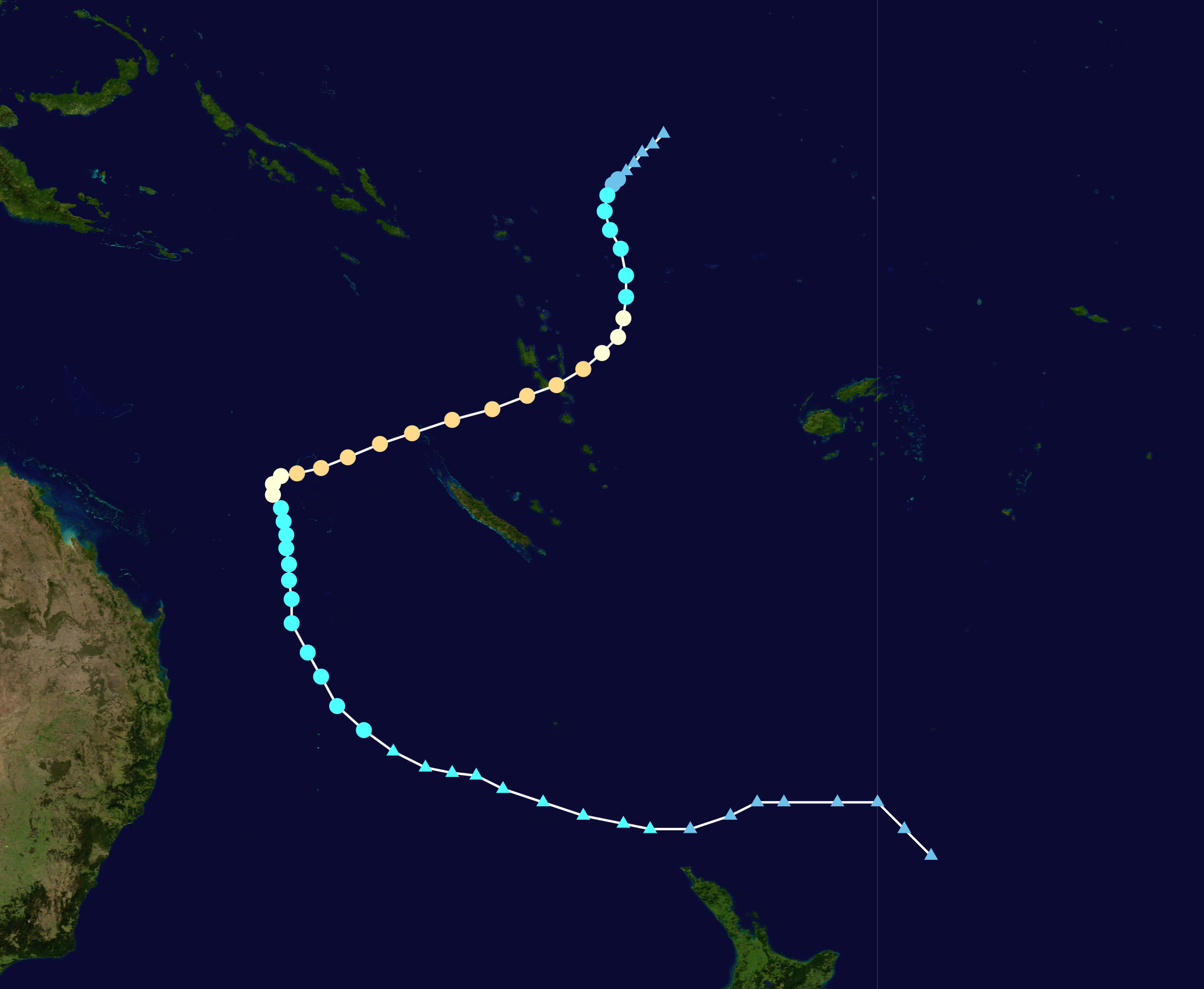
- Duration: January 4 – January 15 (Out of basin from January 10-14)
- Peak intensity: 165 km/h (105 mph) (10-min); 940 hPa (mbar)

Betsy developed on January 6 out of a tropical depression along the monsoon trough. Betsy reached storm intensity. The storm attained hurricane strength before the system hit central parts of Vanuatu. Betsy reached its peak intensity at around 166 km/h (100 mph), with gusts to 240 km/h (150 mph) near its center. On January 11, the cyclone slowed down and curved south, moving out of the tropics on January 13.

Betsy affected five countries. The northern and central regions of Vanuatu were hit the hardest from the cyclone. Five people were killed in Kiribati due to strong or gale force winds.

=== Tropical Cyclone Cliff ===
- Category 2 tropical cyclone (Australian scale)
- Category 1 tropical cyclone (SSHWS)
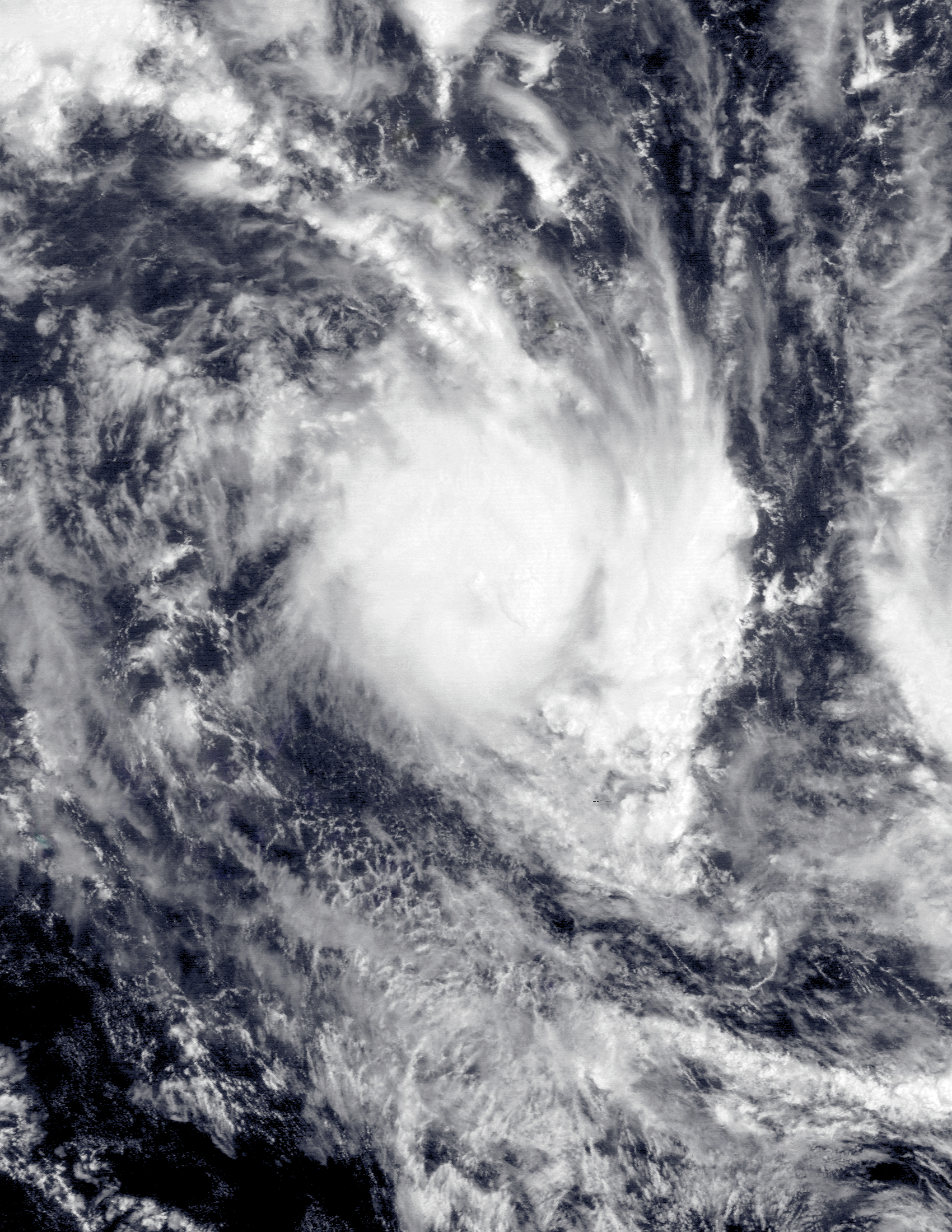
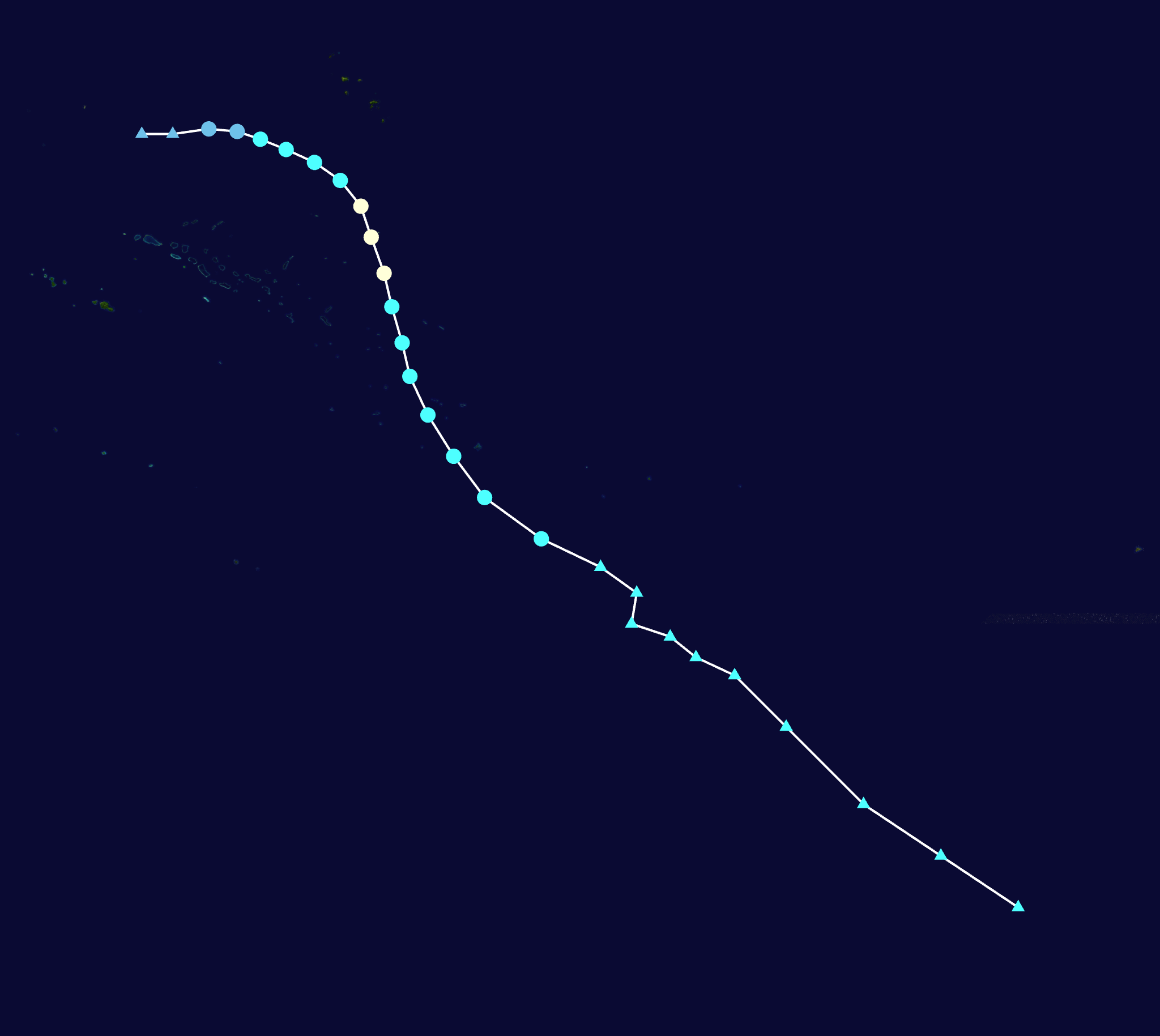
- Duration: February 4 – February 9
- Peak intensity: 100 km/h (65 mph) (10-min); 980 hPa (mbar)

An area of low pressure developed within the monsoon convergence zone during February 4, to the north of the Society Islands. Over the next couple of days, the system gradually consolidated as it moved eastwards and was subsequently named Cliff by the FMS, during February 6, after it had developed into a Category 1 tropical cyclone.

=== Severe Tropical Cyclone Daman ===
- Category 3 severe tropical cyclone (Australian scale)
- Category 2 tropical cyclone (SSHWS)
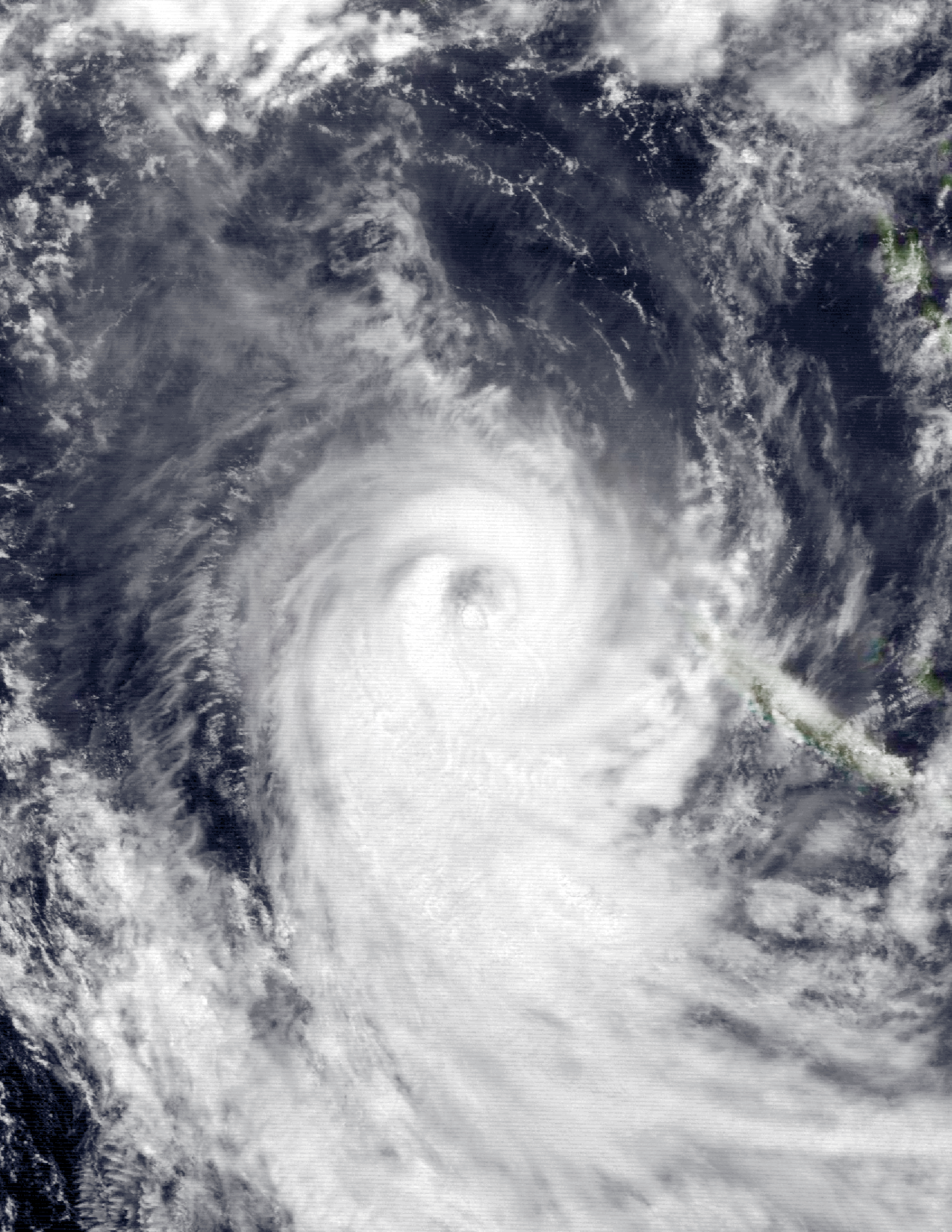
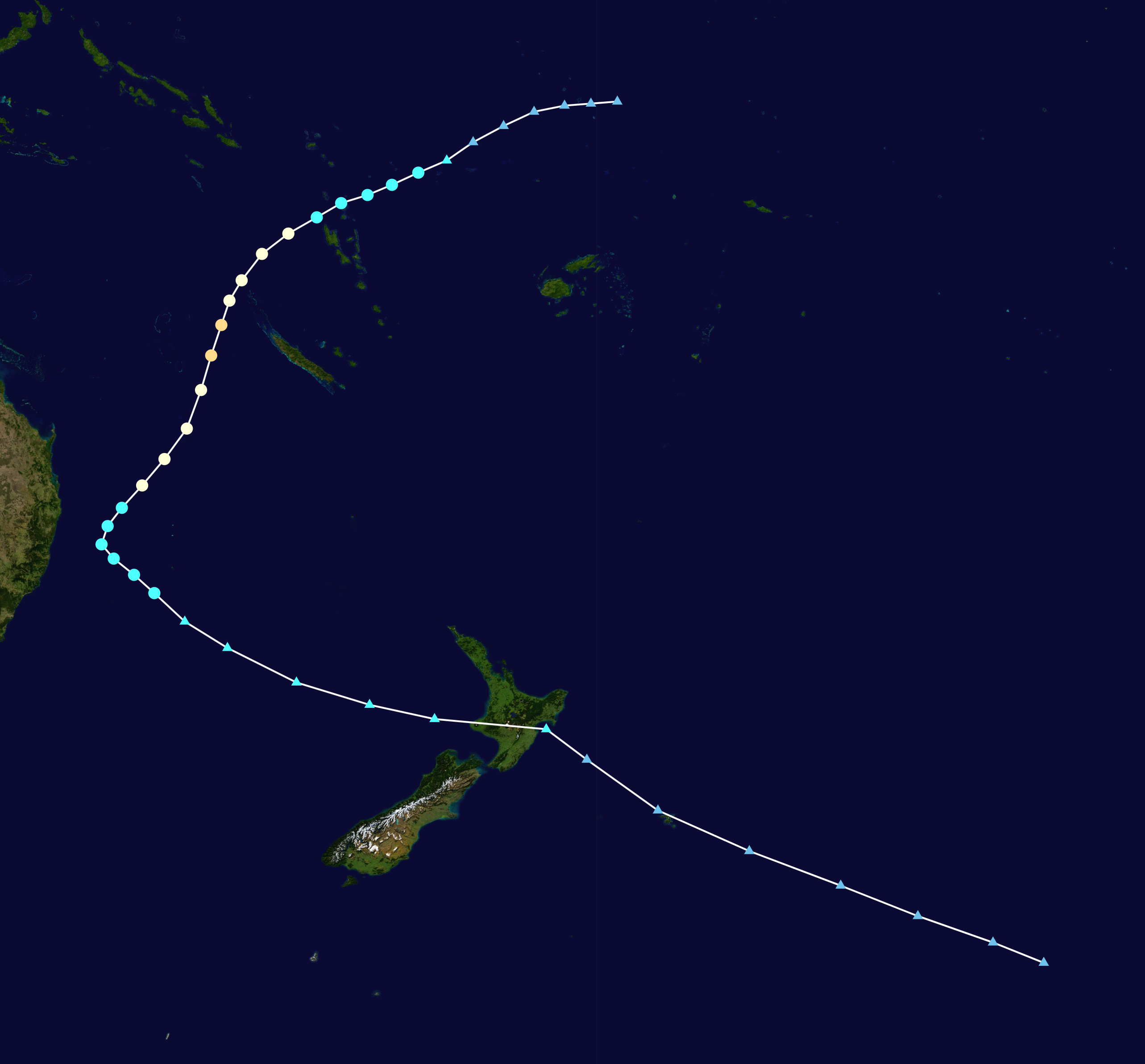
- Duration: February 11 – February 17 (Exited basin)
- Peak intensity: 130 km/h (80 mph) (10-min); 965 hPa (mbar)

On February 11, the FMS started to monitor a shallow tropical depression that had developed within the monsoon trough to the south of Tokelau. Over the next few days the system moved towards the west-southwest under the influence of an easterly steering flow, before the system started to accelerate and passed through the islands of Tuvalu during February 14.

=== Severe Tropical Cyclone Esau ===
- Category 4 severe tropical cyclone (Australian scale)
- Category 4 tropical cyclone (SSHWS)
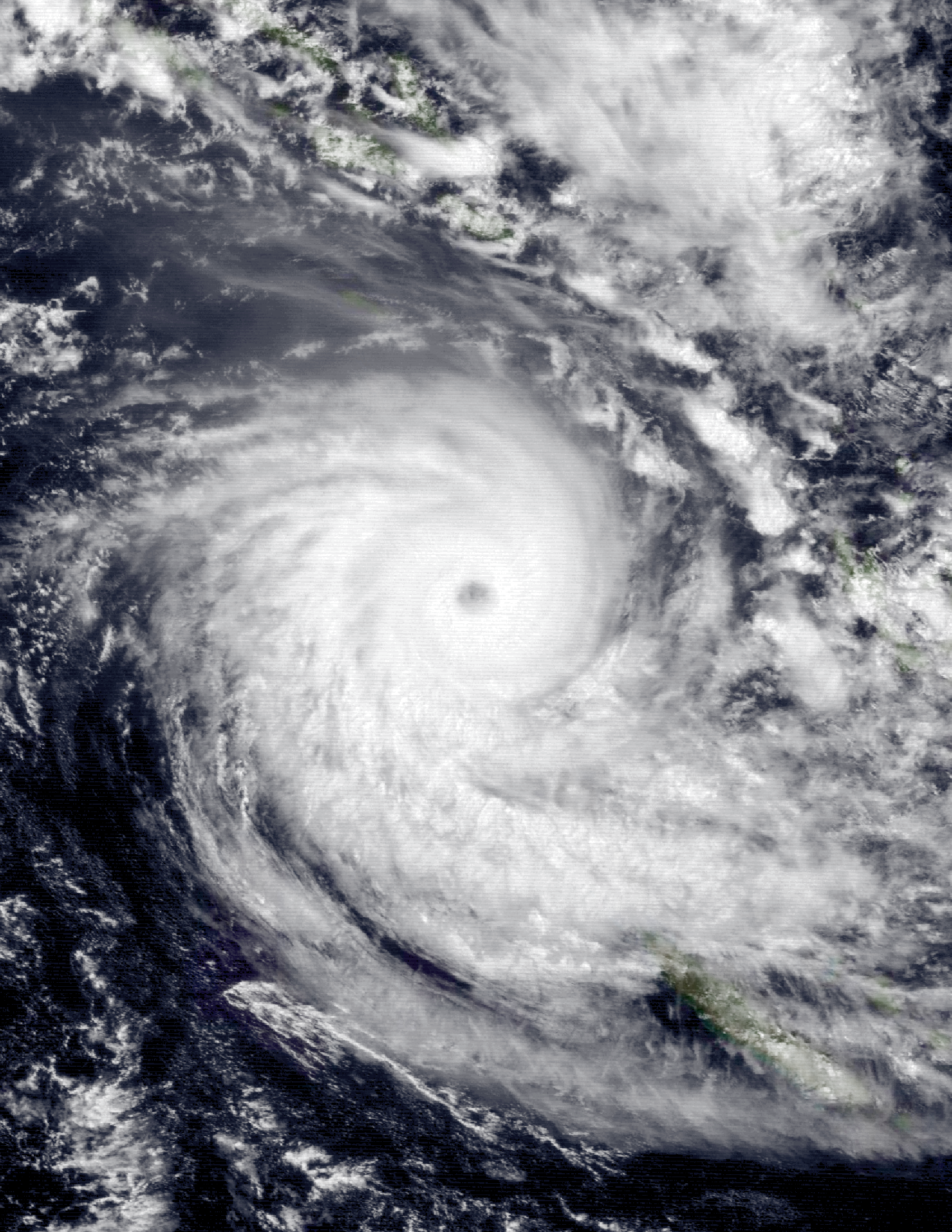
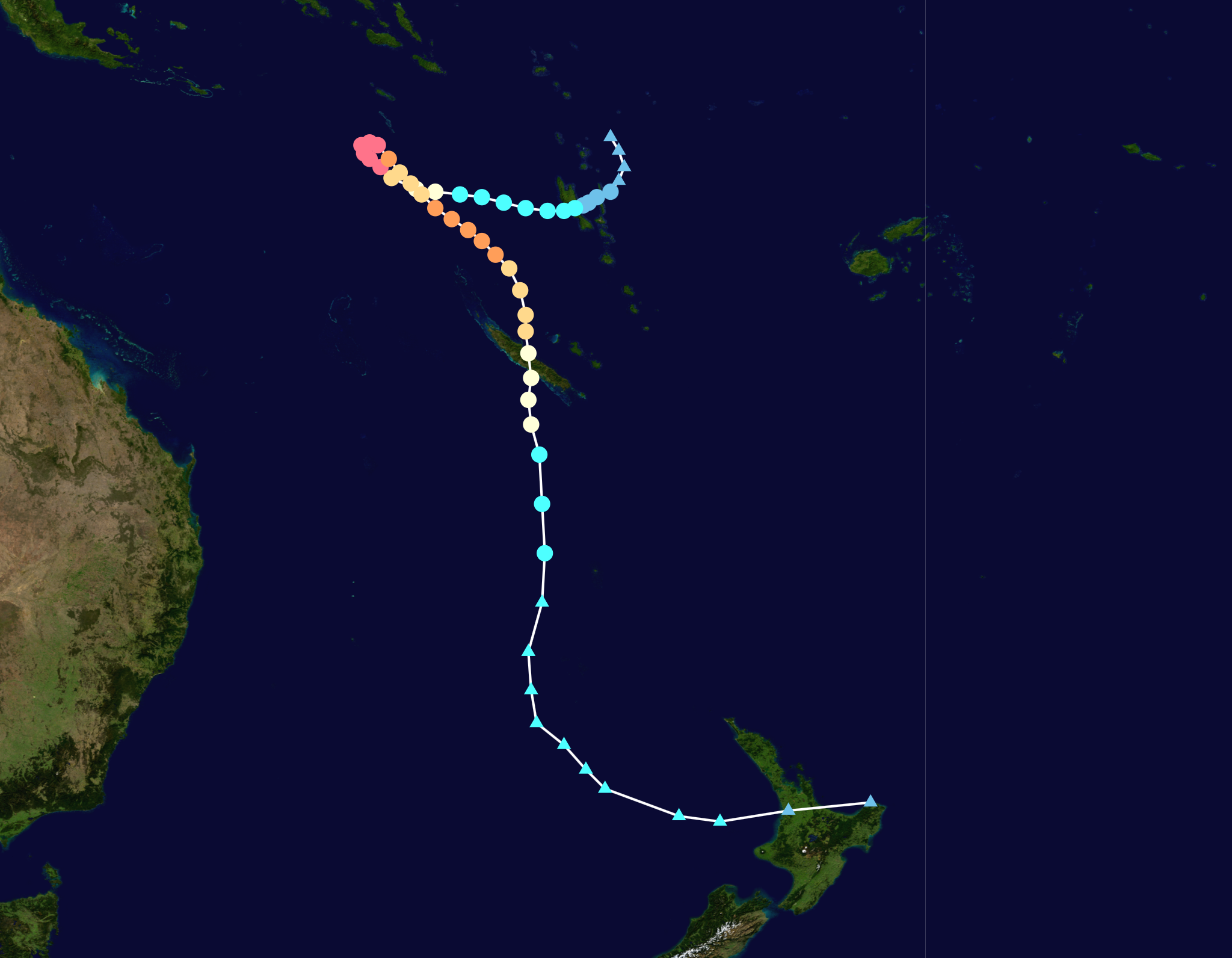
- Duration: February 24 – March 7 (Out of basin from February 28-March 1)
- Peak intensity: 195 km/h (120 mph) (10-min); 925 hPa (mbar)

On February 24, a shallow tropical depression developed within the monsoon trough of low pressure, about 370 km (230 mi) to the northeast of Port Vila, Vanuatu. Over the next day the system moved south-westwards and gradually developed further, before it passed over northern Vanuatu between February 25–27. During February 26, the JTWC and the FMS reported that the depression had developed into a tropical cyclone, with the latter naming it as Easu, while it was located to the east of Espiritu Santo in Vanuatu. Throughout that day as Esau intensified further, it moved south-westwards and away from the islands of Vanuatu. Esau subsequently accelerated westwards to the north of an intense subtropical ridge of high pressure and gradually intensified further as it moved into an area of decreasing vertical windshear. During February 28, the FMS subsequently reported that the system had peaked as a category 4 severe tropical cyclone with 10-minute sustained wind speeds of 185 km/h (115 mph). The system subsequently moved into the Australian region and brought gale-force winds to the Solomon Islands during February 29. The JTWC also reported that Esau had peaked with 1-minute sustained wind speeds of 240 km/h (150 mph), which made it equivalent to a category 4 hurricane. Over the next few days the system moved south-eastwards and back into the South Pacific basin, under the influence of a northwest steering flow and threatened the southern islands of Vanuatu. The system subsequently came to within 450 km (280 mi) of southern Vanuatu before turning southwards and threatening the French overseas territory of New Caledonia. The system made landfall on the French territory of New Caledonia during March 4, as a category 3 severe tropical cyclone. As a result of passing over the mountainous island nation and increasing vertical wind shear, the system transitioned into an extratropical cyclone over the cooler waters of the Tasman Sea. The extratropical remnants of Cyclone Esau subsequently made landfall on New Zealand's North Island during March 8, before they were last noted during the next day over the South Pacific Ocean.

The system caused minimal damage and one death as it affected the Solomon Islands, Vanuatu, New Caledonia and New Zealand. There was no damage reported in Vanuatu, despite the system being considered to be as powerful and potentially damaging as Cyclone Uma. Within the Solomon Islands several banana, coconut and pawpaw trees were knocked down as the system produced gale-force winds on the islands, while various taro gardens and food crops were flooded and destroyed. Within the French territory of New Caledonia, extensive flooding was reported in the territory, while power and communications were knocked out over the island. A hail and a tornado were reported on March 8, as the system's remnants made landfall on New Zealand's North Island in the Taranaki and Hawkes Bay area.

=== Severe Tropical Cyclone Fran ===
- Category 5 severe tropical cyclone (Australian scale)
- Category 5 tropical cyclone (SSHWS)
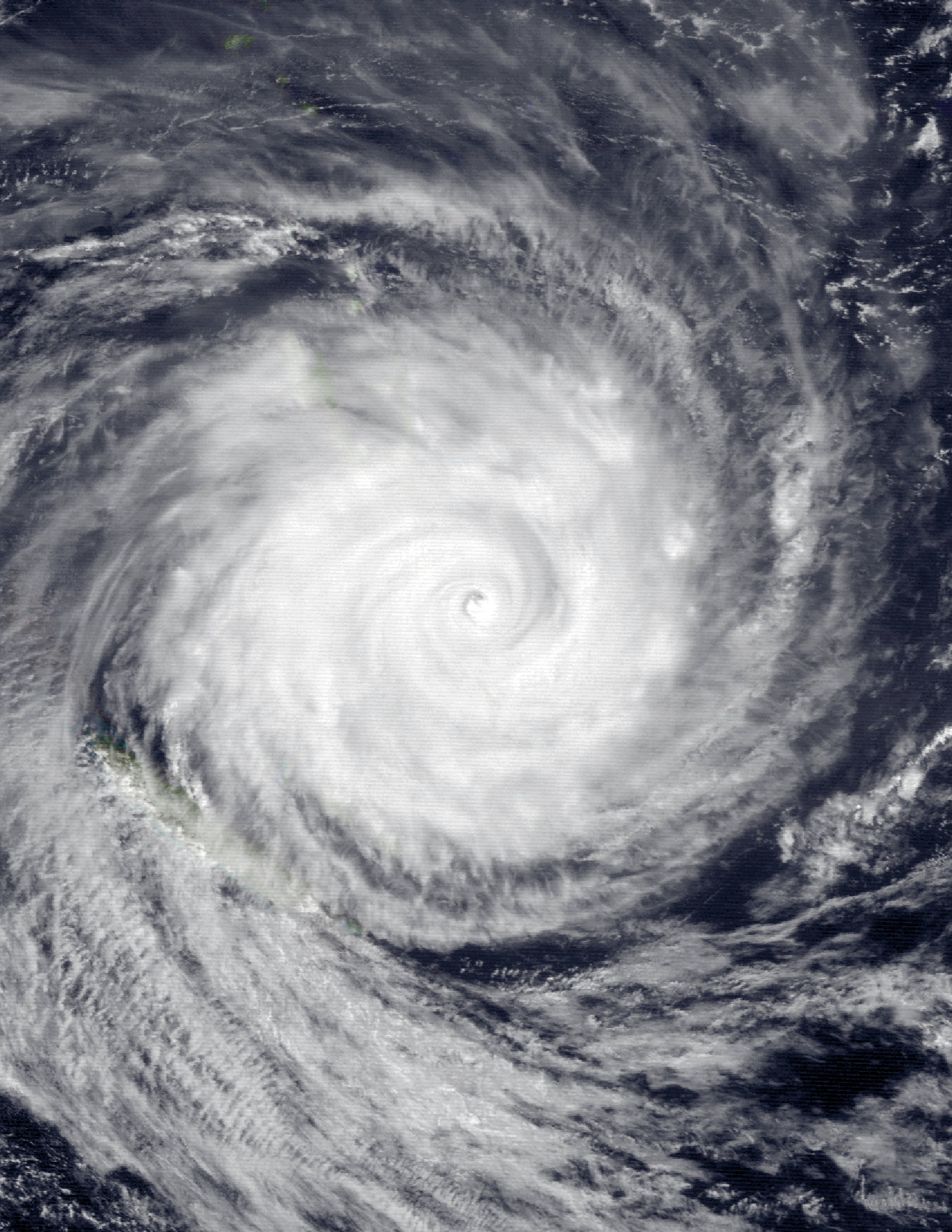
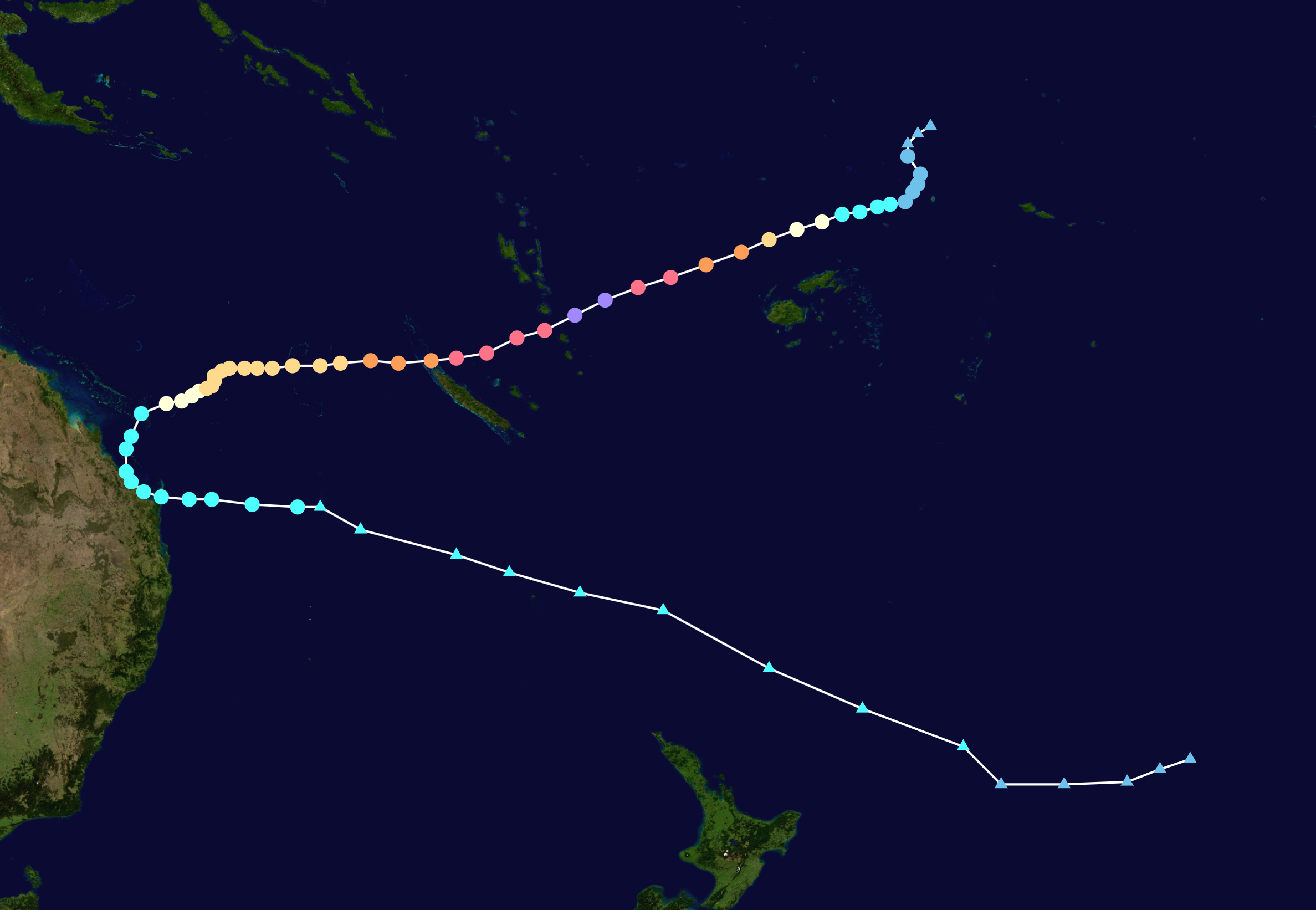
- Duration: March 4 – March 11 (Exited basin)
- Peak intensity: 205 km/h (125 mph) (10-min); 920 hPa (mbar)

The origins of Fran were from a low that was first identified by meteorologists on 4 March. Fran slowly became organized and by 1800 UTC 5 March, the system had developed gale-force winds. Moving in a general west-southwest direction, Fran passed between the Wallis and Futuna Islands while attaining cyclone intensity. The storm began to rapidly intensify and soon crossed the International Dateline. Meanwhile, Fran developed hurricane-force winds. During the ensuing 24 hours, the cyclone tracked across waters to the north of Fiji and towards the central islands of Vanuatu. Shortly before doing so, Fran peaked in intensity.

After weakening slightly due to land interaction, the cyclone slowly re-intensified. Cyclone Fran passed north of New Caledonia around 0000 UTC 10 March, only to turn towards the west and attained its secondary peak of 145 km/h (90 mph). It then exited the basin and into the Australian region, where it made landfall near Queensland, and coming back over water and re-entering the South Pacific basin as an extra-tropical cyclone. The remnants of Fran tracked over Norfolk Island before ultimately being merged by a trough north of New Zealand.

On the Wallis Islands and the Futuna Islands, damage to trees, telephone and power lines were experienced. Meanwhile, several boats sunk and buildings lost roofs. Vanuatu felt the worst of the storms impact in the South Pacific. In Erromango, homes were destroyed, considerable crop damage occurred and a storm surge was reported. On Efate, over 130 houses lost their respective roofs. Considerable amounts of rainfall was also reported, peaking on Wallis Island with 540 mm (21 in) of rain.

=== Tropical Cyclone Gene ===
- Category 2 tropical cyclone (Australian scale)
- Tropical storm (SSHWS)
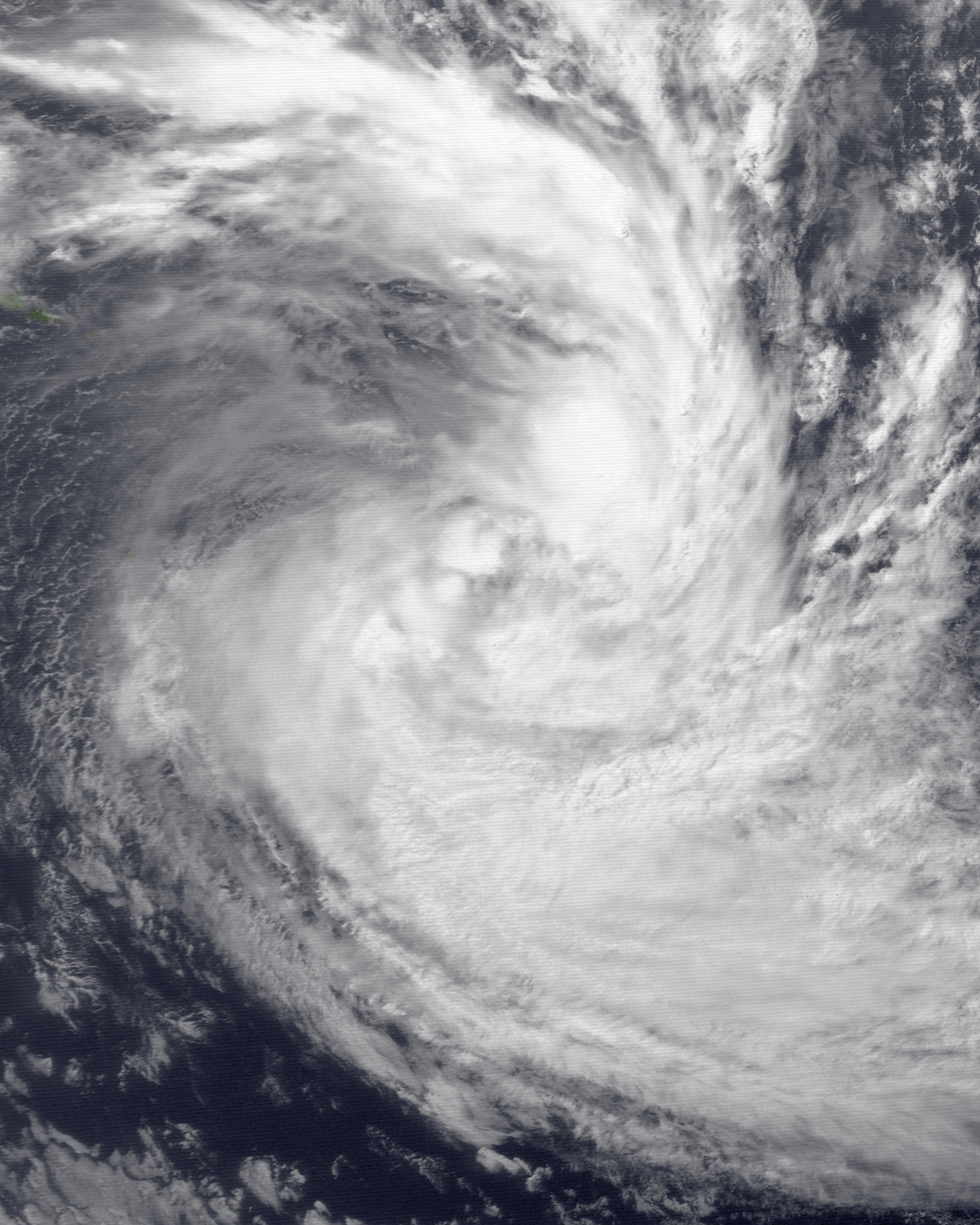
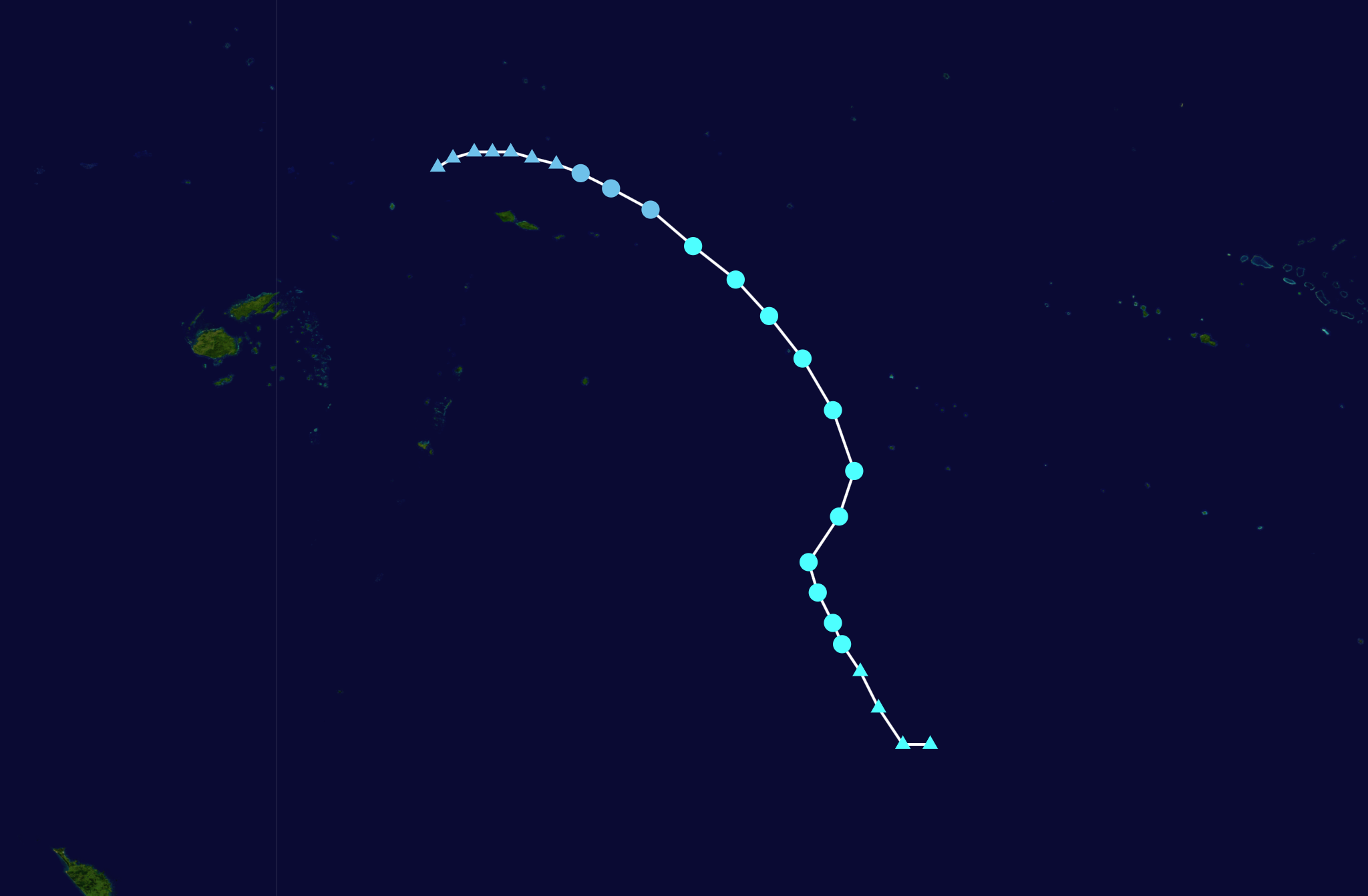
- Duration: March 15 – March 19
- Peak intensity: 95 km/h (60 mph) (10-min); 985 hPa (mbar)

During March 13, a tropical depression developed within a broad area of low pressure, about 215 km (135 mi) to the northwest of Mata-Utu in the island nation of Wallis and Futuna. Over the next couple of days, the depression moved eastwards towards the northern Cook Islands, before a second circulation developed and consolidated within the broad area of low pressure during March 15. The second circulation was subsequently classified as Tropical Cyclone 26P by the NWOC later that day, before the FMS named it Gene during March 16, after it had developed into a Category 1 tropical cyclone.

=== Tropical Cyclone Hettie ===
- Category 1 tropical cyclone (Australian scale)
- Tropical storm (SSHWS)
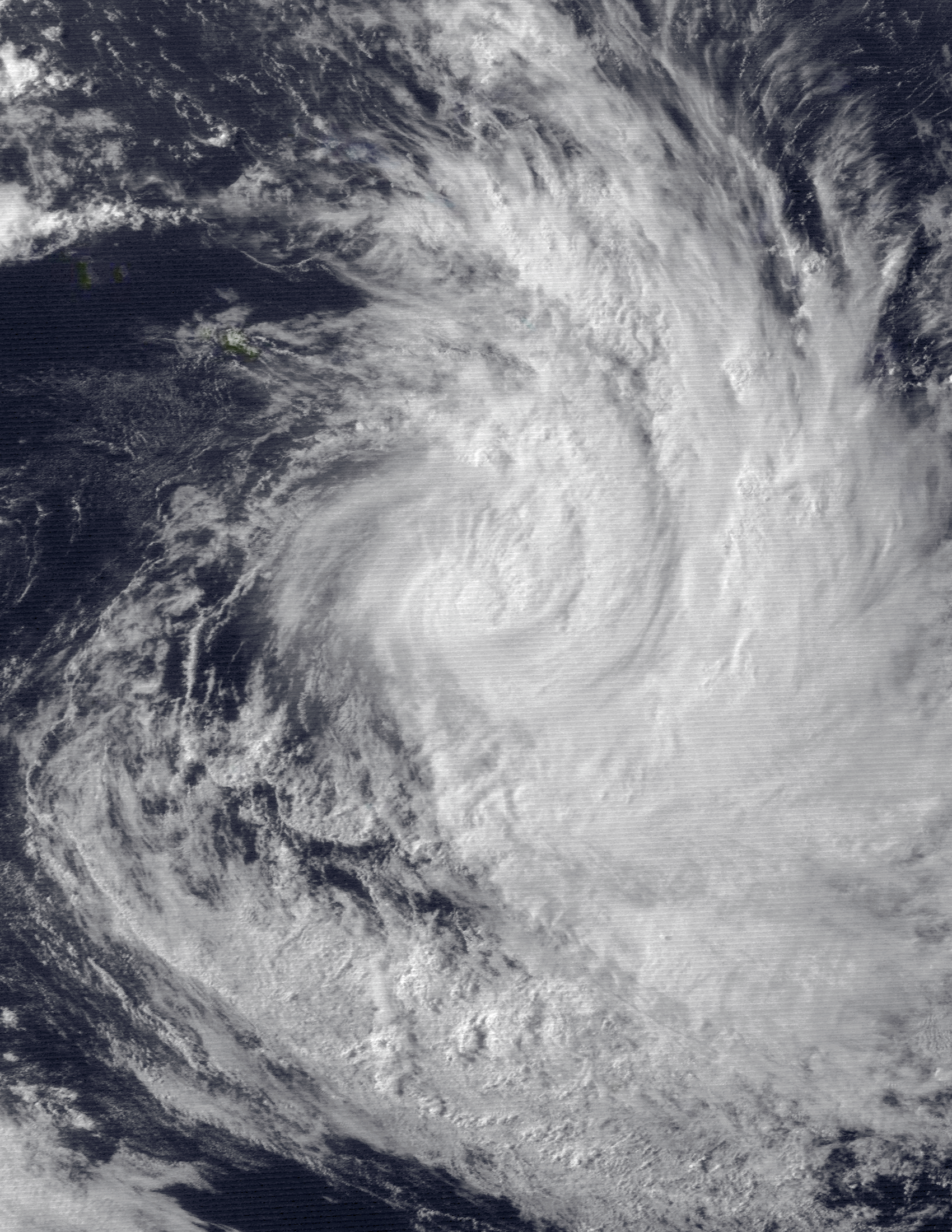
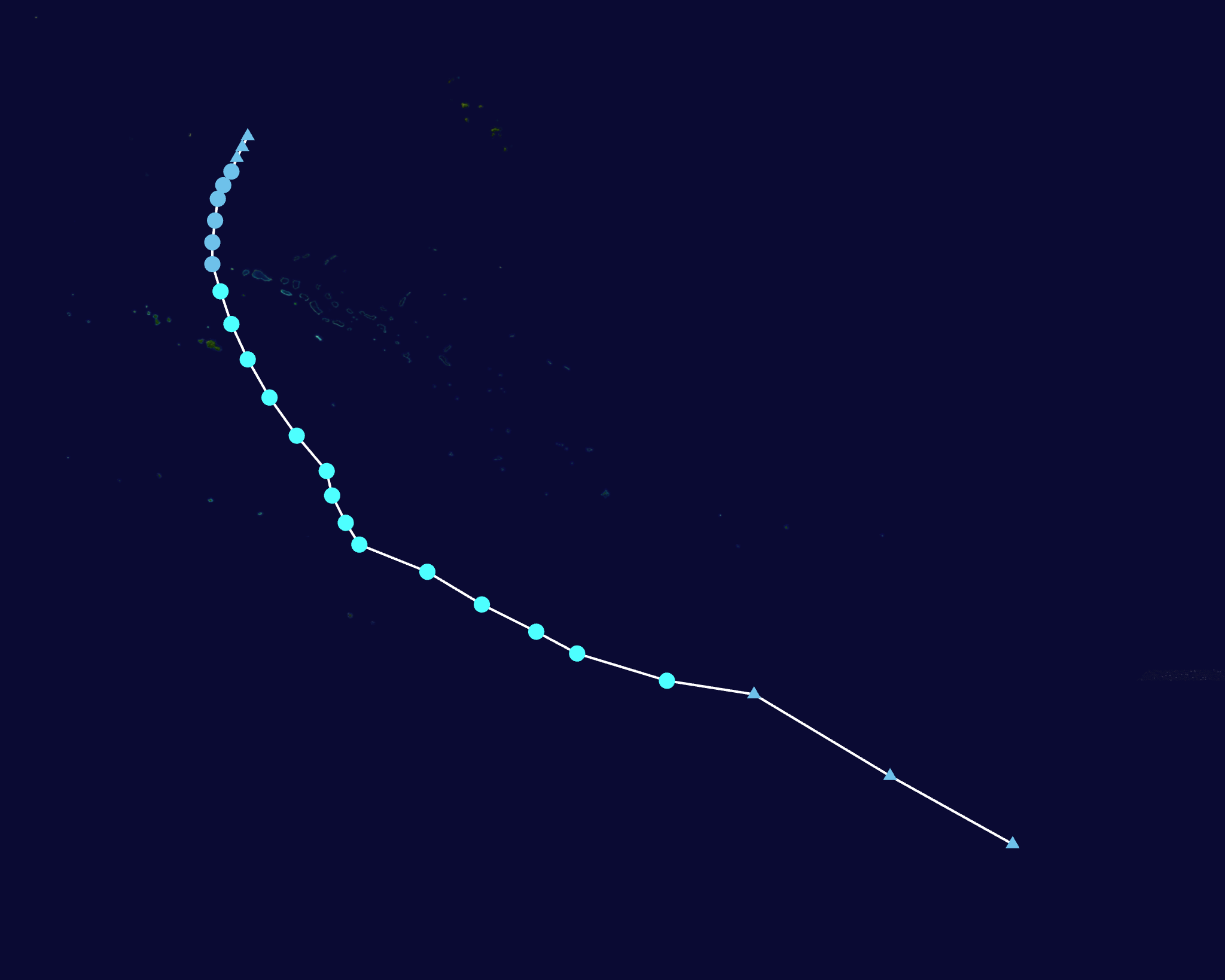
- Duration: March 24 – March 29
- Peak intensity: 85 km/h (50 mph) (10-min); 987 hPa (mbar)

During March 24, the FMS reported that a tropical depression had developed within the South Pacific Convergence Zone and a favourable environment for further development, to the north of the Tuamotu Islands in French Polynesia. During that day, the system gradually developed further with its convective cloud signature improving, as it moved slowly south-eastwards under the influence of a northerly environmental steering flow. During the following day, the NPMOC and the FMS reported that the depression had developed into a tropical cyclone, with the latter naming it as Hettie after gale-force wind speeds had wrapped around the system's centre. After being named, Hettie gradually intensified further as it moved south-eastwards and passed in between Tahiti, Hereheretue and Nukutepipi during March 26. During March 27, the FMS reported that the system had peaked with estimated 10-minute sustained windspeeds of 85 km/h (50 mph), while it was located about 150 km (95 mi) to the southwest of Hereheretue. This was followed by the NPMOC later that day, who estimated that Hettie had peaked with 1-minute peak sustained windspeeds of 100 km/h (65 mph).

After it had peaked in intensity, Hettie started to weaken and transition into an extratropical cyclone, under the influence of stronger vertical windshear and cooler sea surface temperatures. The system was subsequently declared an extratropical cyclone during March 29, before its remnants were absorbed by a frontal system. As Hettie moved through French Polynesia, it did not directly impact any island or atoll within the arhipeliagoatoll, however, the meteorological station on the atoll of Hereheretue reported sustained winds of 76 km/h (47 mph), wind gusts of over 100 km/h (62 mph) and a northeasterly swell of about 4 metres (13 ft). There were no deaths associated with Hettie, while some minor damage to crops and property was reported in Hereheretue. During March 26, the French Polynesian authorities seized a boat of Greenpeace activists, after it had come to within 22 km (14 mi) of the French nuclear-test atoll: Mururoa. It was subsequently claimed that the ship was subsequently towed to the French atoll of Fangataufa to ride out Hettie. However, this was disputed by Greenpeace who claimed that the ship was held at Fangataufa to prevent them setting up a site on the atoll, in order to take samples of the radioactive pollution of the environment.

=== Tropical Cyclone Innis ===
- Category 2 tropical cyclone (Australian scale)
- Category 1 tropical cyclone (SSHWS)
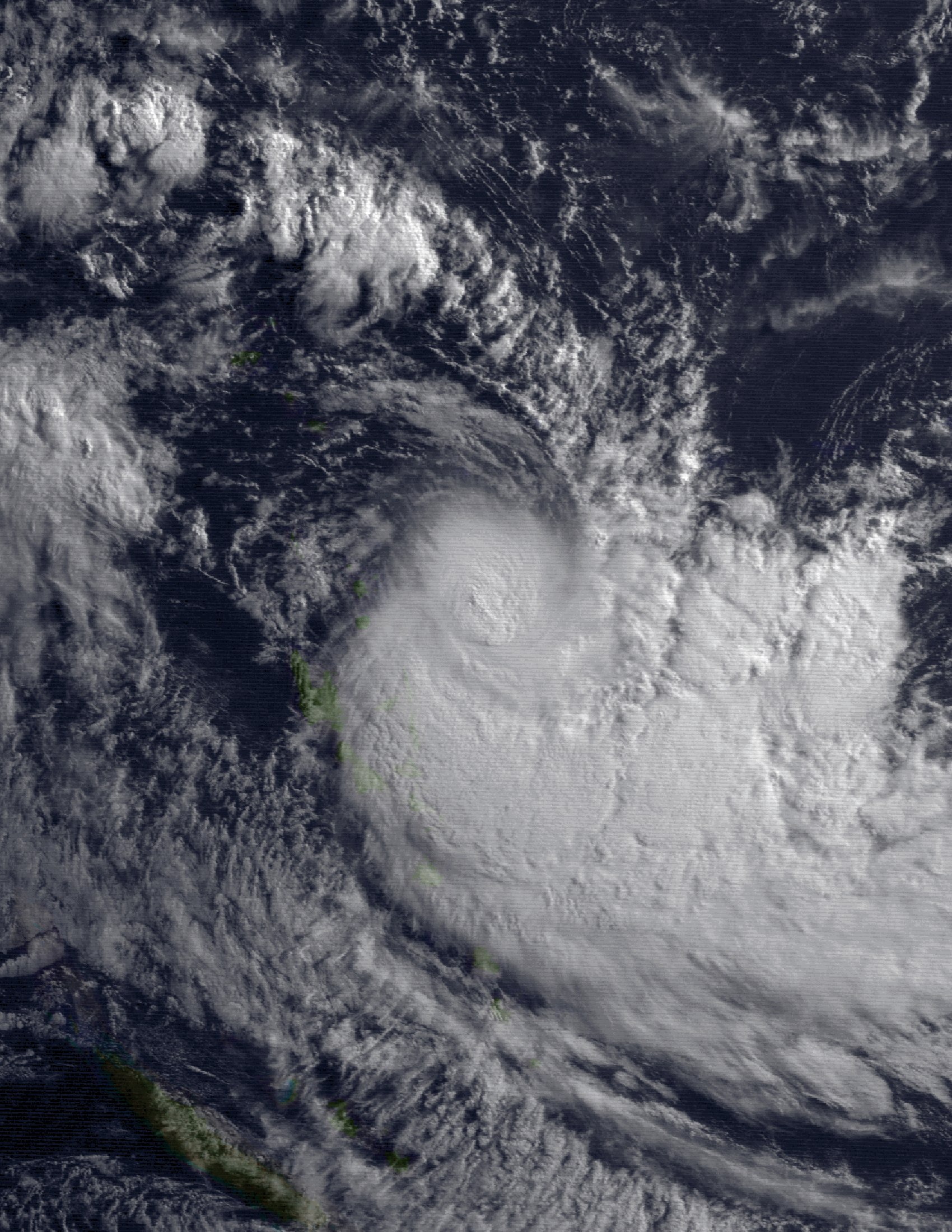
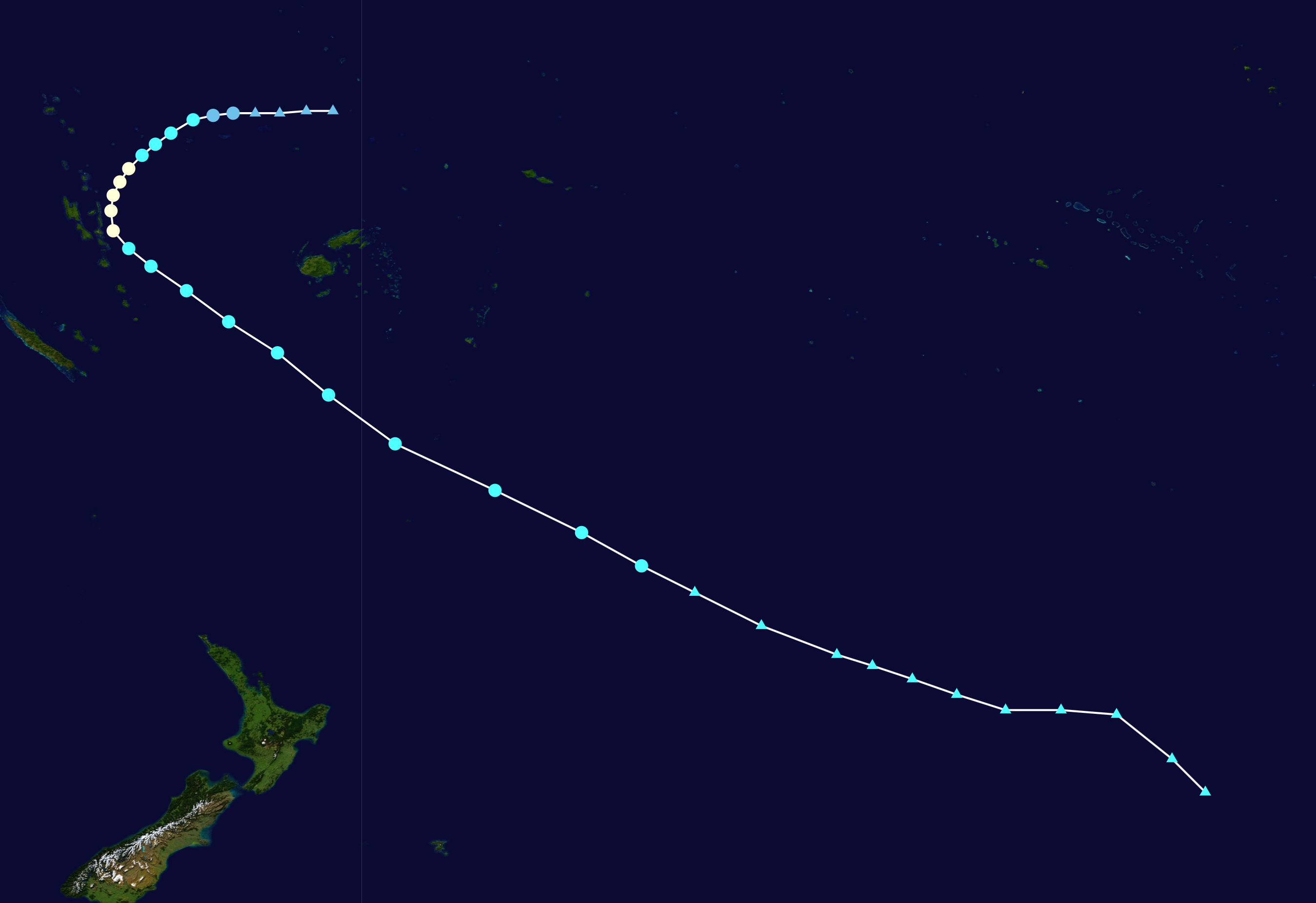
- Duration: April 23 – May 2
- Peak intensity: 95 km/h (60 mph) (10-min); 985 hPa (mbar)

On April 23, the FMS started to monitor a depression that had developed within the South Pacific Convergence Zone, between Tokelau and the Cook Islands and was slowly deepening under the influence of a strong upper-level ridge of high pressure. The system subsequently moved westwards and was over the western part of Tokelau by April 25, before it started to accelerate westwards under the influence of an intensifying anticyclone that was located near New Zealand. Over the next couple of days the depression moved westwards and passed over southern Tuvalu during April 27, before the system slowed down while it was located about 555 km (345 mi) to the east of the Solomon Island: Anuta. During April 28, the JTWC and FMS reported that the system had developed into a tropical cyclone, with the latter naming it as Innis. After it had been named Innis continued to intensify further and acquired a symmetrical cloud signature during March 29, before the JTWC reported that the system had peaked with 1-minute maximum sustained windspeeds of 120 km/h (75 mph).

Early the next day, the FMS reported that Innis had reached its peak 10-minute maximum sustained wind speeds of about 95 km/h (60 mph) which made it a category 2 tropical cyclone, while the system was located about 110 km (70 mi) to the east of Tikopia in the eastern Solomon Islands. As it peaked in intensity, an amplifying upper-level trough in the Coral Sea produced north-easterly to north-westerly upper-level winds in the vicinity of Innis, which caused the system to turn towards the south and then southeast. The trough of low pressure also increased vertical windshear over Innis, which meant that the system started to rapidly weaken during April 30, as it passed about 100 km (60 mi) to the east of Pentecost, Ambryn and Epi Islands. By early on May 1, Innis had lost its cloud structure and as a result, the FMS reported that it was no longer classifiable as a tropical cyclone and downgraded it to a depression. Despite some gale-force winds possibly occurring in the Solomon Islands and Vanuatu, there were no reports of any deaths or damage associated with Innis.

=== Other systems ===
On January 17, the NWOC initiated advisories on Tropical Cyclone 13P, which had developed to the south of one of the Cook Islands, Manihiki. The system subsequently moved south-eastwards through the Cook Islands and peaked with 1-minute wind speeds of 65 km/h (40 mph) before it transitioned into an extra-tropical cyclone during the next day. During April 7, the FMS started to monitor a tropical depression that had developed about 620 km (385 mi) to the northeast of Nouméa, New Caledonia. Over the next day the system moved south-eastwards and was absorbed into a frontal system during the next day.

== Season effects ==
This table lists all the storms that developed in the South Pacific basin during the 1991–92 season. It includes their intensity on the Australian Tropical cyclone intensity scale, duration, name, areas affected, deaths, and damages. For most storms the data is taken from RSMC Nadi's and or TCWC Wellington's archives, however, data for 13P has been taken from the JTWC/NPMOC archives as opposed to RSMC Nadi's or TCWC Wellington's, and thus the winds are over 1-minute as opposed to 10-minutes and compared to the SSHWS. The impacts listed for Severe Tropical Cyclone's Daman and Fran include the impacts, they caused to Australia while they were in the Australian region.

1991–92 South Pacific cyclone season
Name	Dates active	Peak intensity			Areas affected	Damage (US$)	Deaths	Refs
Name	Dates active	Category	Wind speed	Pressure	Areas affected	Damage (US$)	Deaths	Refs
Tia	November 12 – 21	Category 3 severe tropical cyclone	140 km/h (85 mph)	960 hPa (28.35 inHg)	Kiribati, Solomon Islands, Vanuatu	Minimal	None	
Val	December 4 – 17	Category 4 severe tropical cyclone	165 km/h (105 mph)	940 hPa (27.76 inHg)	Tuvalu, Tokelau, Cook Islands; Wallis and Futuna, Tonga; Samoa, American Samoa	$300 million	16	
Wasa-Arthur	December 3 – 18	Category 4 severe tropical cyclone	165 km/h (105 mph)	940 hPa (27.76 inHg)	French Polynesia	$60 million	2	
Betsy	January 4 – 15	Category 4 severe tropical cyclone	165 km/h (105 mph)	940 hPa (27.76 inHg)	Vanuatu	Unknown	2	
13P	January 16 – 18	Tropical depression	Not Specified	Not Specified	None	None	None	
Cliff	February 5 – 9	Category 2 tropical cyclone	95 km/h (60 mph)	980 hPa (28.94 inHg)	French Polynesia	Unknown	Unknown	
Daman	February 11 – 19	Category 3 severe tropical cyclone	130 km/h (80 mph)	965 hPa (28.50 inHg)	Tokelau, Vanuatu, Queensland; New Zealand	Unknown	Unknown	
Esau	February 24 – March 7	Category 4 severe tropical cyclone	195 km/h (120 mph)	925 hPa (27.32 inHg)	Solomon Islands, Vanuatu; New Caledonia, New Zealand	Unknown	Unknown	
Fran	March 4 – 17	Category 5 severe tropical cyclone	205 km/h (125 mph)	920 hPa (27.17 inHg)	Wallis and Futuna, Fiji, Vanuatu; New Caledonia, Australia	Unknown	Unknown	
Gene	March 15 – 19	Category 2 tropical cyclone	95 km/h (60 mph)	985 hPa (29.09 inHg)	Cook Islands	Unknown	Unknown	
Hettie	March 23 – 29	Category 1 tropical cyclone	75 km/h (45 mph)	987 hPa (29.15 inHg)	French Polynesia	Minimal	None	
Unnamed	April 7 – 8	Tropical depression	Not Specified	Not Specified	None	None	None	
Innis	April 23 – May 2	Category 2 tropical cyclone	95 km/h (60 mph)	985 hPa (29.09 inHg)	Tokelau, Solomon Islands, Vanuatu	None	None	
Season aggregates
13 systems	November 12, 1991 – May 2, 1992		205 km/h (125 mph)	920 hPa (27.17 inHg)		$360 million	20	

== See also ==
- Tropical cyclones in 1991 and 1992
- Atlantic hurricane seasons: 1991, 1992
- Pacific hurricane seasons: 1991, 1992
- Pacific typhoon seasons: 1991, 1992
- North Indian Ocean cyclone seasons: 1991, 1992
