= Anuanuraro =

Atoll in French Polynesia

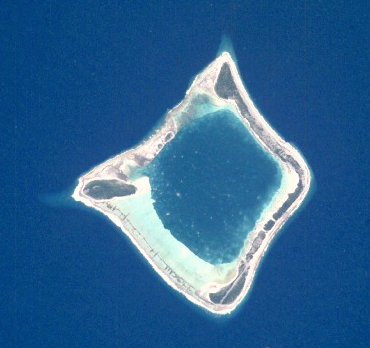
- NASA picture of Anuanuraro Atoll

- Location within French Polynesia

Geography
- Location: Pacific Ocean
- Coordinates: 20°26′13″S 143°32′15″W
- Archipelago: Tuamotus
- Area: 7 km^{2} (2.7 sq mi) (lagoon); 2.2 km^{2} (1 sq mi) (above water)
- Length: 5.3 km (3.29 mi)
- Width: 3.2 km (1.99 mi)

Administration
- France
- Overseas collectivity: French Polynesia
- Administrative subdivision: Îles Tuamotu-Gambier
- Commune: Hao

Demographics
- Population: Uninhabited (2012)

Anuanuraro is an atoll in French Polynesia, Pacific Ocean. It is part of the Duke of Gloucester Islands, a subgroup of the Tuamotu group. Anuanuraro's nearest neighbor is Anuanurunga, which is located about 29 km to the southeast.

Anuanuraro is a small atoll. It measures 5.3 km in length, with a maximum width of 3.2 km and a land area of 2.2 km^{2}. Its shape is roughly square and its lagoon is totally enclosed by the fringing reef.

Anuanuraro Atoll is uninhabited.

== History ==
First sighting recorded by Europeans was by the Spanish expedition of Pedro Fernández de Quirós on 4 February 1606. With the other three atolls of the Duke of Gloucester Islands they were named Cuatro Coronas (Four Crowns in Spanish).

British naval officer and explorer Philip Carteret visited the Duke of Gloucester islands in 1767. He named this atoll Archangel.

Formerly Ananuararo Atoll belonged to Robert Wan, the wealthy Tahitian pearl trader. It was bought back by the government of French Polynesia in March 2002.

This atoll has an airfield which was built by Wan's company, Wan-Polynésie. It was opened in 1982 but is now in disuse.

== Administration ==
Administratively the four atolls of the Duke of Gloucester Islands, including the uninhabited ones of Anuanuraro, Anuanuruga and Nukutepipi, belong to the commune of Hereheretue, which is associated to the Hao commune.
