= Nukutepipi =

Atoll in French Polynesia

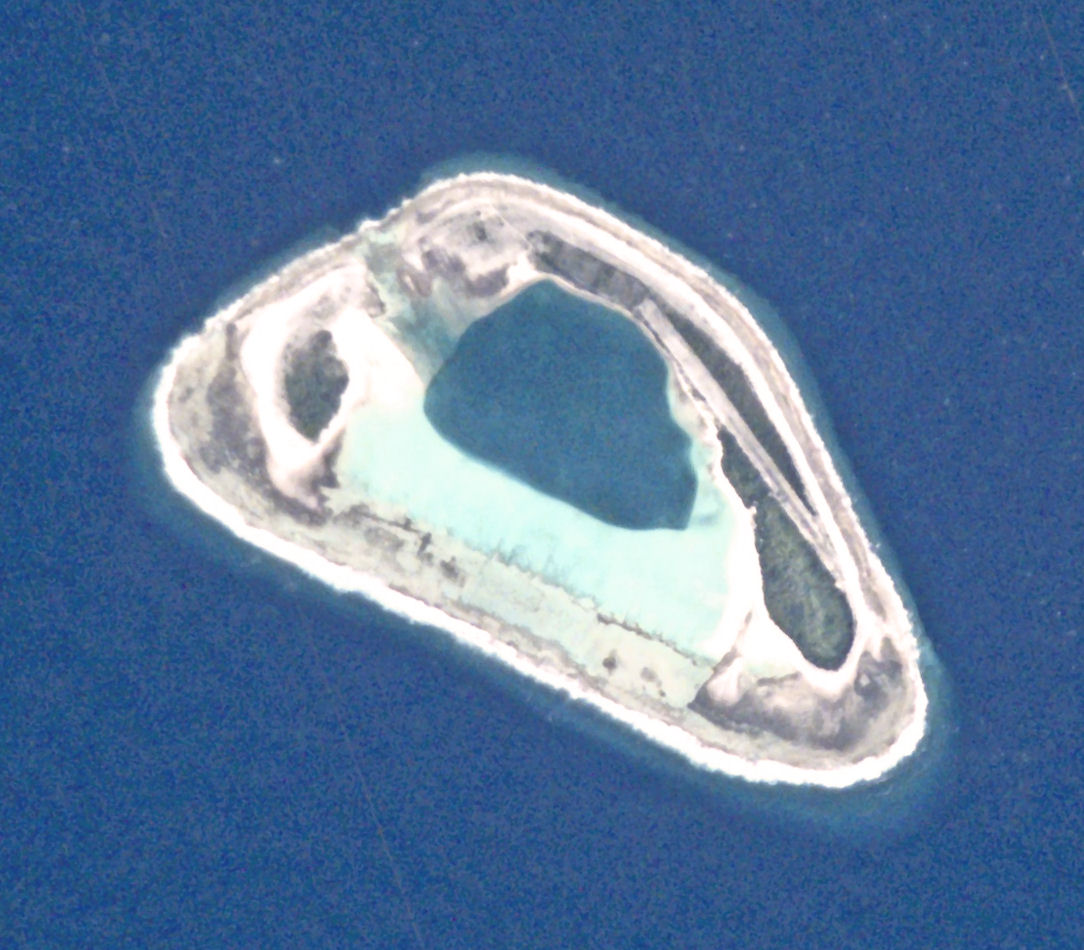
- NASA picture of Nukutepipi Atoll

- Location within French Polynesia

Geography
- Location: Pacific Ocean
- Coordinates: 20°41′S 143°04′W
- Archipelago: Tuamotus
- Area: 1.3 km^{2} (0.50 sq mi) (lagoon); 2.3 km^{2} (0.9 sq mi) (above water)
- Length: 2.7 km (1.68 mi)

Administration
- France
- Overseas collectivity: French Polynesia
- Administrative subdivision: Îles Tuamotu-Gambier
- Commune: Hao

Demographics
- Population: Uninhabited (2012)

Nukutepipi, or Nuku-te-pipi is an atoll in French Polynesia, Pacific Ocean. It is part of the Duke of Gloucester Islands, a subgroup of the Tuamotu group. Nukutepipi's nearest neighbor is Anuanurunga, which is located about 22 km to the WNW.

Nukutepipi is a very small atoll. It is roughly triangular-shaped, measuring approximately 2.7 km in length. Its reef is quite broad, enclosing completely the small lagoon, which has a deep area at its centre. There are two relatively large islands on its reef, one on its eastern side and the other on the northwest.

Nukutepipi Atoll was once inhabited but is currently not. It has a small airfield which was inaugurated in 1982. It is now owned by Cirque du Soleil's Guy Laliberté.

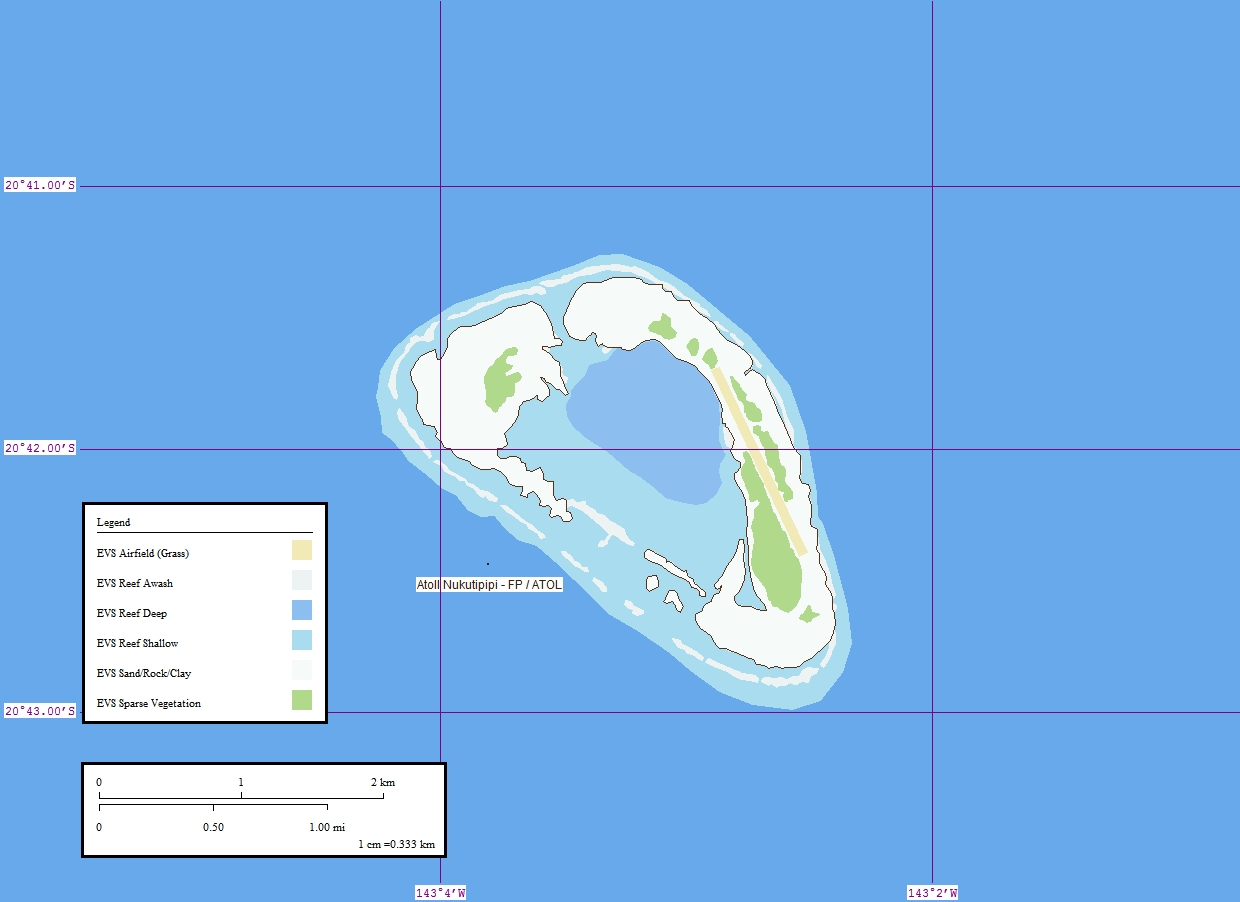
Map of Nukutepipi Atoll

== History ==
First sighting recorded by Europeans was by the Spanish expedition of Pedro Fernández de Quirós on 4 February 1606. With the other three atolls of the Duke of Gloucester Islands they were named Cuatro Coronas (Four Crowns in Spanish).

British naval officer and explorer Philip Carteret visited it on 12 July 1767 who only referred to it in his logs as "the southernmost island". John Turnbull aboard the Margaret named it "Margaret island" on 6 March 1803 after the ship. Lieutenant Ringgold of the Wilkes Expedition visited the atoll on 6 January 1841. He identified the correct name of the atoll as "Nukutipipi" by the natives.

On 13 November 2019, Guy Laliberté's investment firm Lune Rouge stated "Laliberté is being questioned in respect of cultivation of cannabis for his personal use only at the residence on the island of Nukutepipi".

== Administration ==
Administratively the four atolls of the Duke of Gloucester Islands, including the uninhabited ones of Nukutepipi, Anuanuruga, and Anuanuraro, belong to the commune of Hereheretue, which is associated to the Hao commune.
