= Anuanurunga =

Atoll in French Polynesia

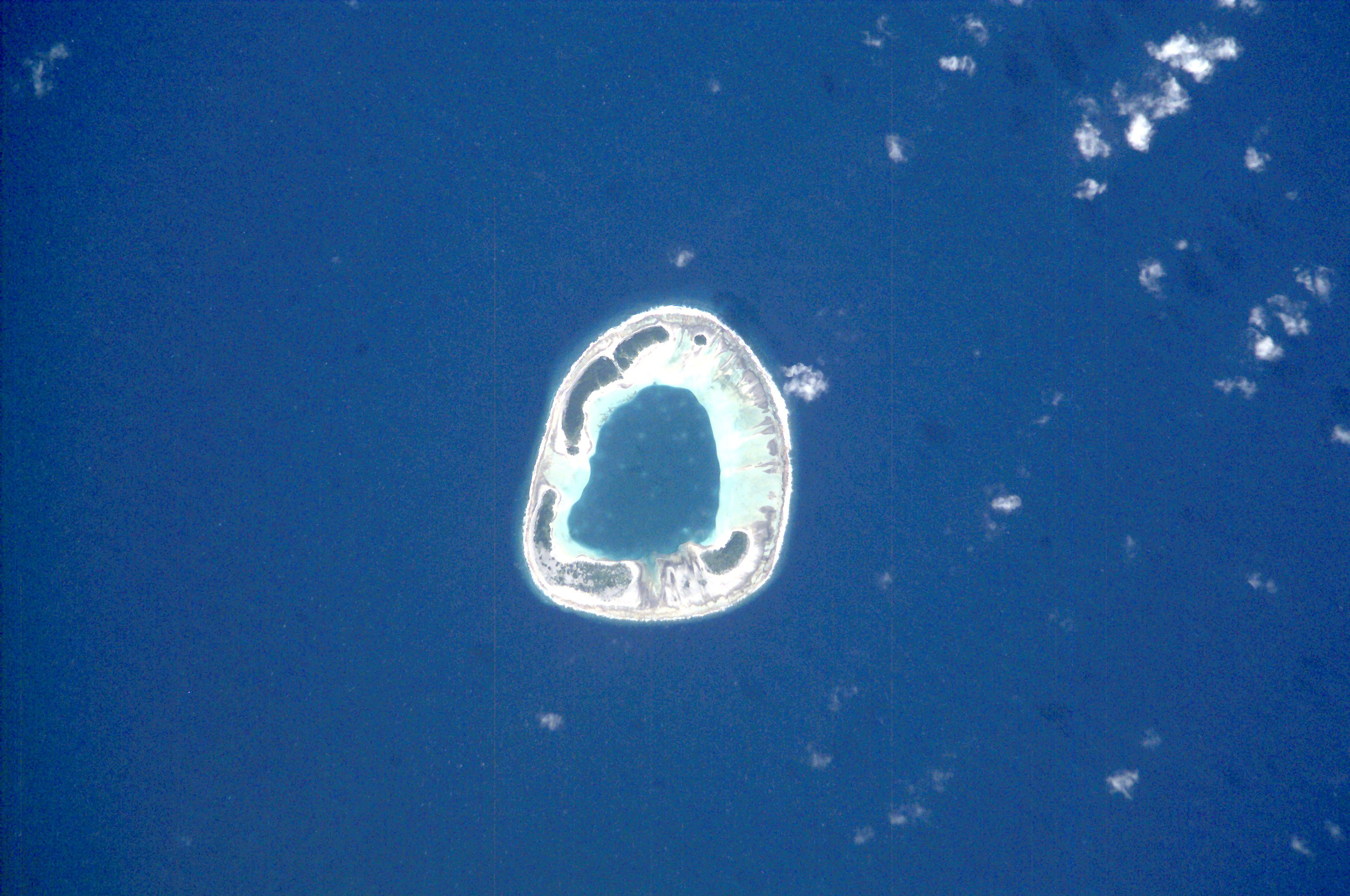
- NASA picture of Anuanurunga Atoll

- Location within French Polynesia

Geography
- Location: Pacific Ocean
- Coordinates: 20°36′S 143°24′W
- Archipelago: Tuamotus
- Area: 2.6 km^{2} (1.0 sq mi) (lagoon); 7 km^{2} (3 sq mi) (above water)
- Width: 3.3 km (2.05 mi)

Administration
- France
- Overseas collectivity: French Polynesia
- Administrative subdivision: Îles Tuamotu-Gambier
- Commune: Hao

Demographics
- Population: Uninhabited (2012)

Anuanurunga is an atoll in French Polynesia, Pacific Ocean. It is part of the Duke of Gloucester Islands, a subgroup of the Tuamotu group. Anuanurunga's nearest neighbor is Nukutepipi, which is located about 22 km (14 mi) to the ESE.

Anuanurunga is a very small atoll. It is ring-shaped, measuring approximately 3.3 km (2.1 mi)in diameter with a total area of 7 km^{2} (3 sq mi). Its reef is quite broad, enclosing completely the small lagoon. There are four relatively large islands on its reef, as well as a few small motu.

Anuanurunga Atoll is currently uninhabited.

== History ==
First sighting recorded by Europeans was by the Spanish expedition of Pedro Fernández de Quirós on 4 February 1606. With the other three atolls of the Duke of Gloucester Islands they were named Cuatro Coronas (Four Crowns in Spanish).

British naval officer and explorer Philip Carteret visited it in 1767. He named this atoll Four Crowns.

== Administration ==
Administratively the four atolls of the Duke of Gloucester Islands, including the uninhabited ones of Anuanuruga, Anuanuraro and Nukutepipi, belong to the commune of Hereheretue, which is associated to the Hao commune.
