= Archers Cay =

Island in The Bahamas

- Location within Bahamas

Geography
- Location: Atlantic Ocean
- Coordinates: 26°36′N 77°10′W

Administration
- Bahamas

Archers Cay is an island in The Bahamas, near Water Cay. It is a part of Central Abaco province.
