= Duke of Gloucester Islands =

- Location within French Polynesia

Geography
- Location: Pacific Ocean
- Coordinates: 20°16′S 143°56′W
- Archipelago: Tuamotus
- Area: 17.72 km^{2} (6.84 sq mi)

Administration
- France
- Overseas collectivity: French Polynesia
- Administrative subdivision: Tuamotus
- Commune: Hao
- Largest settlement: Otetou

Demographics
- Population: 56 (2012)

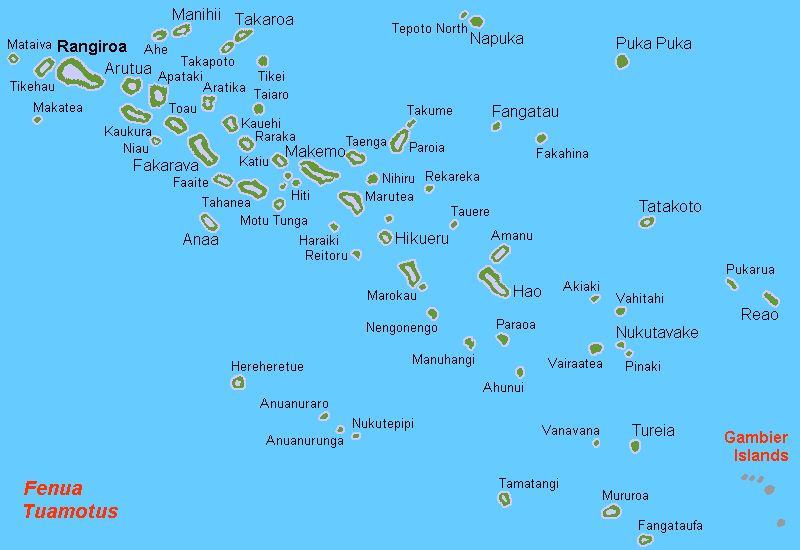
Map of the Tuamotus; the Duke of Gloucester Islands are located south of the main Tuamotu atoll cluster.

The Duke of Gloucester Islands (French: Îles du Duc de Gloucester) is a subgroup of the Tuamotu group in French Polynesia. They are located southeast of Tahiti and south of the main Tuamotu atoll cluster and are rather isolated.

== Atolls ==
The Duke of Gloucester Islands include four atolls of relatively small size:

- Anuanuraro
- Anuanurunga
- Hereheretue
- Nukutepipi

Hereheretue (19°52′S 144°58′W) is located to the northwest of the group of the other three atolls, which are located at 20°36′S 143°20′W and are uninhabited. Hereheretue is the only permanently inhabited island of the Duke of Gloucester Islands, with 57 inhabitants in 2002.

== History ==
First sighting recorded by Europeans was by the Spanish expedition of Pedro Fernández de Quirós on 4 February 1606. They were named Cuatro Coronas ("Four Crowns" in Spanish). Gaspar González de Leza, pilot of Fernández de Quiros, charted them as Cuatro Anegadas ("Flooded Four").

They were renamed Duke of Gloucester Islands by the British explorer Philip Carteret, who visited them in 1767, in honour of Prince William, Duke of Gloucester.

== Administration ==
Administratively the four atolls of the Duke of Gloucester Islands belong to the commune of Hereheretue, which is associated with the Hao commune.
