= Hereheretue =

Atoll in French Polynesia

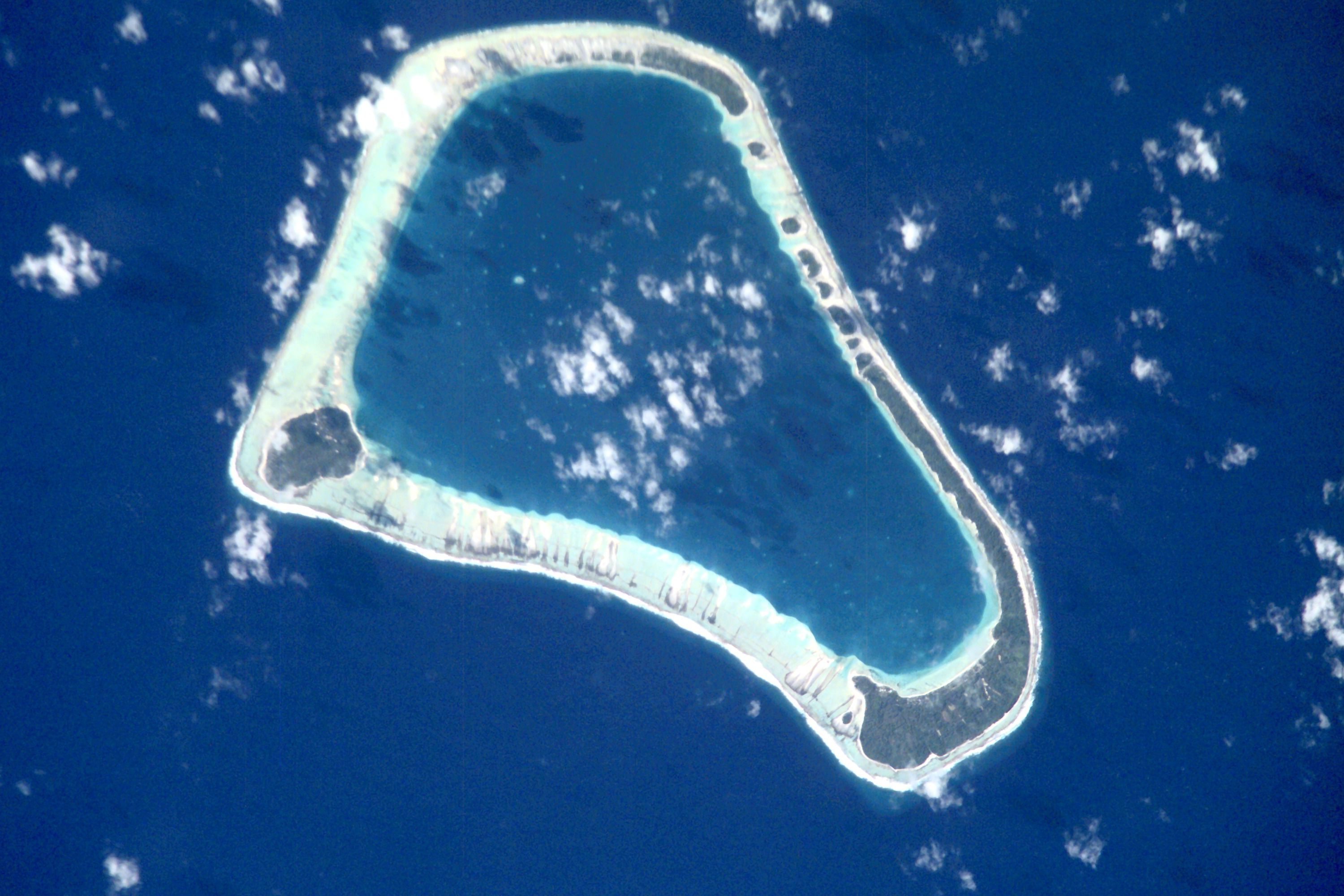
- NASA picture of Hereheretue Atoll

- Location within French Polynesia

Geography
- Location: Pacific Ocean
- Coordinates: 19°52′20″S 144°57′46″W
- Archipelago: Tuamotus
- Area: 23 km^{2} (8.9 sq mi) (lagoon); 4 km^{2} (2 sq mi) (above water)
- Length: 9 km (5.6 mi)
- Width: 7 km (4.3 mi)

Administration
- France
- Overseas collectivity: French Polynesia
- Administrative subdivision: Îles Tuamotu-Gambier
- Commune: Hao
- Largest settlement: Otetou

Demographics
- Population: 56 (2012)

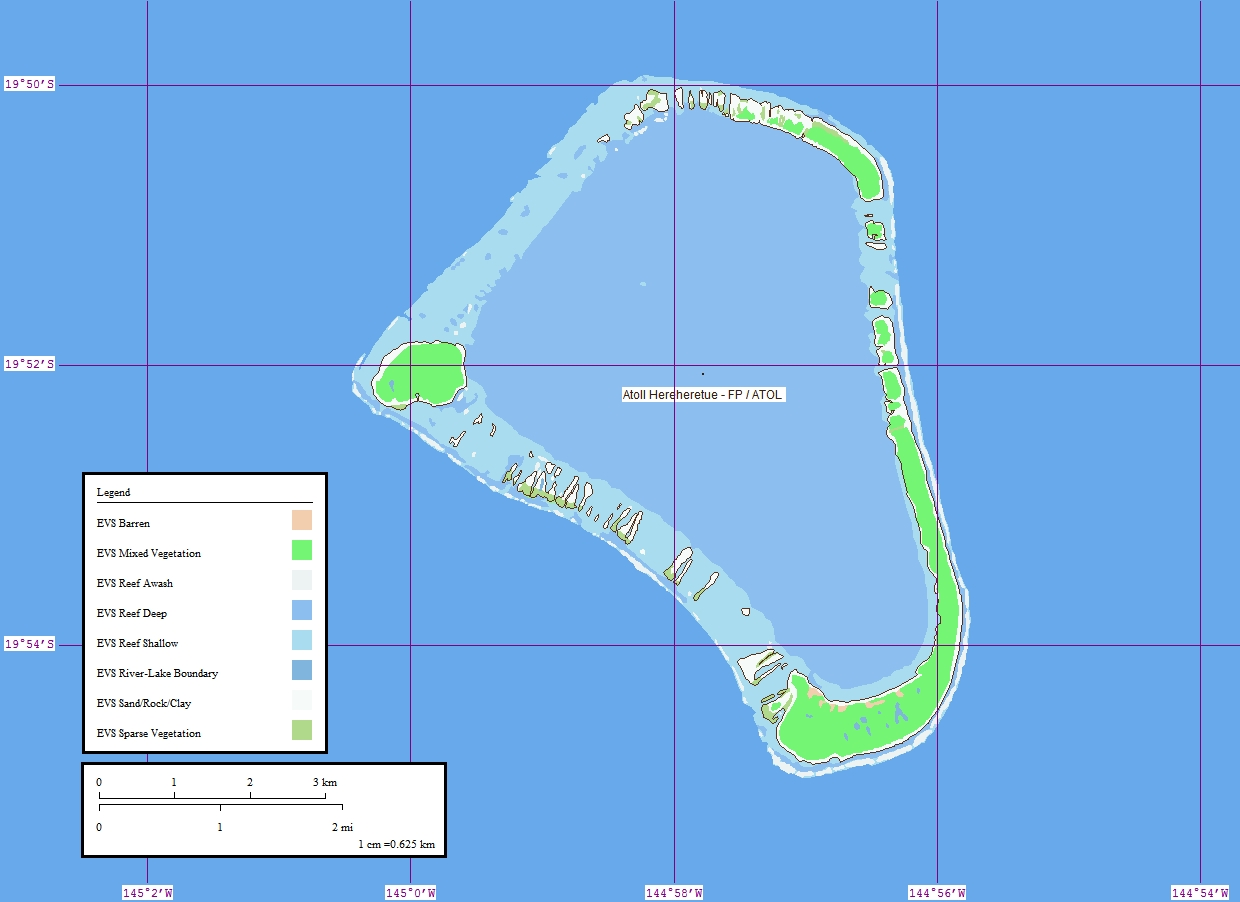
Map of Hereheretue Atoll

Hereheretue or Hiri-oro is an atoll in French Polynesia, Pacific Ocean. It is the northernmost island of the Duke of Gloucester Islands group, or Îles du Duc de Gloucester, a subgroup of the Tuamotu group. Hereheretue's nearest neighbour is Anuanuraro, which is located about 150 km away. It lies 450 km southwest of Hao and 488 km southeast of Tahiti.

Hereheretue Atoll has a roughly trapezoidal shape. Its lagoon is quite deep and has an area of 23 km^{2}. The broad reef completely encloses the lagoon, so that there is no navigable passage to enter it.

Hereheretue is the only permanently inhabited atoll of the group. It had a population of 56 at the 2012 census. Most of the population lives in the main village Otetou.

== History ==
The first recorded sighting by Europeans was by the Spanish expedition of Pedro Fernández de Quirós on 4 February 1606. With the other three atolls of the Duke of Gloucester Islands they were named Cuatro Coronas (Four Crowns in Spanish).

== Administration ==
Administratively the four atolls of the Duke of Gloucester Islands, including Anuanuraro, Anuanurunga and Nukutepipi, belong to the commune of Hereheretue, which is associated with the Hao commune.

There is a meteorological station on Hereheretue.
