= List of islands of France =

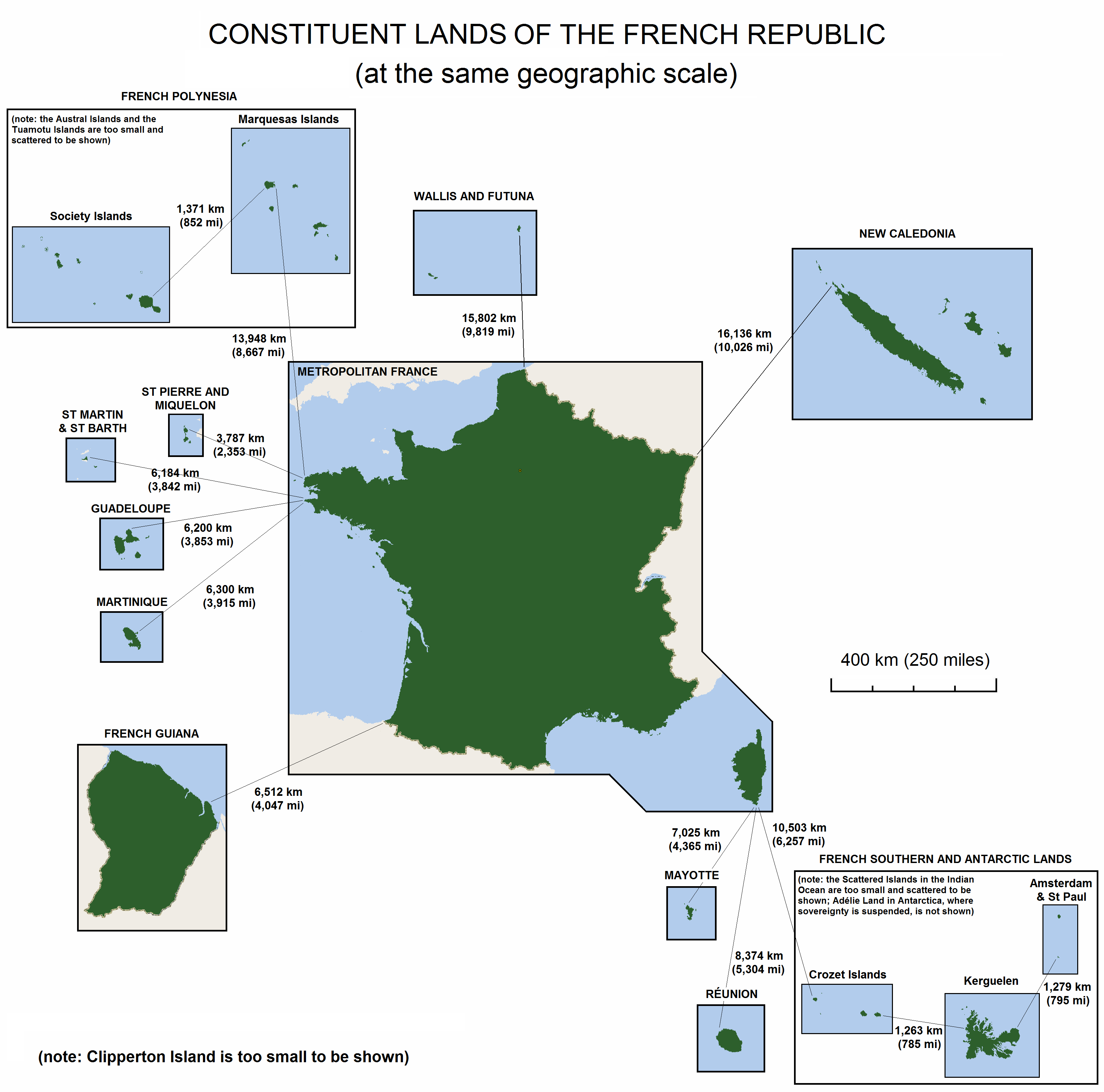
The lands making up the French Republic, shown at the same geographic scale

This is a list of islands of France, including both metropolitan France and French overseas islands.

== Ranking of French islands ==
=== By area ===
All French islands over 100 km^{2} (39 sq mi), ranked by decreasing area.

Rank	Name	Location	Area (km^{2})	Area (sq mi)
1	Grande-Terre (main island of New Caledonia)	New Caledonia	16,372	6,321
2	Corsica	Mediterranean Sea	8,680	3,350
3	Grande-Terre (main island of the Kerguelen Islands)	Kerguelen Islands	6,675	2,577
4	Réunion	Réunion	2,512	970
5	Lifou	New Caledonia	1,146	442
6	Martinique	Martinique	1,128	436
7	Tahiti	French Polynesia	1,036	400
8	Basse-Terre	Guadeloupe	848	327
9	Maré	New Caledonia	657	254
10	Grande-Terre (main island of Guadeloupe)	Guadeloupe	586	226
11	Grande-Terre (main island of Mayotte)	Mayotte	363	140
12	Nuku Hiva	French Polynesia	345	133
13	Hiva Oa	French Polynesia	318	123
14	Miquelon	Saint-Pierre-et-Miquelon	214	83
15	Île Foch	Kerguelen Islands	206	80
16	Oléron	Atlantic Ocean	190	73
17	Raiatea	French Polynesia	173	67
18	Marie-Galante	Guadeloupe	158	61
19	Île de la Possession	Crozet Islands	153	59
20	Île des Pins	New Caledonia	141	54
21	Ouvéa	New Caledonia	133	51
22	Moorea	French Polynesia	132	51
23	Île de l'Est	Crozet Islands	122	47
24	Ua Pou	French Polynesia	112	43

=== By population ===
List of the most populated French islands.

Rank	Name	Location	Population
1	Réunion	Indian Ocean	802,000 (January 2008)
2	Martinique	Caribbean Sea	402,000 (January 2008)
3	Corsica	Mediterranean Sea	302,000 (January 2008)
4	New Caledonia's mainland (Grande-Terre)	Pacific Ocean	205,939 (August 2009)
5	Guadeloupe's Grande-Terre	Caribbean Sea	197,603 (January 2006)
6	Guadeloupe's Basse-Terre	Caribbean Sea	186,661 (January 2006)
7	Tahiti	Pacific Ocean	178,133 (August 2007)
8	Mayotte's mainland (Grande Terre)	Indian Ocean	162,036 (July 2007)
9	Saint Martin (French part only)	Caribbean Sea	35,263 (January 2006)
10	Mayotte's Petite Terre (aka Pamanzi)	Indian Ocean	24,416 (July 2007)
11	Oléron	Bay of Biscay	20,991 (January 2006)
12	Île de Ré	Bay of Biscay	17,640 (January 2006)
13	Moorea	Pacific Ocean	16,191 (August 2007)
14	Raiatea	Pacific Ocean	12,024 (August 2007)
15	Marie-Galante	Caribbean Sea	12,009 (January 2006)
16	Lifou	Pacific Ocean	10,170 (August 2004)
17	Noirmoutier	Bay of Biscay	9,813 (January 2006)
18	Wallis (aka Uvea)	Pacific Ocean	9,227 (July 2008)
19	Bora Bora	Pacific Ocean	8,927 (August 2007)
20	Saint Barthélemy	Caribbean Sea	8,450 (January 2007)

== Islands of metropolitan France ==
=== Atlantic coast ===
List of inhabited islands of Atlantic France:

	Name	Region	Population	Area (km^{2})
1	Oléron	Nouvelle-Aquitaine	21,871	174
2	Île de Ré	Nouvelle-Aquitaine	17,723	85
3	Noirmoutier	Pays de la Loire	9,590	49
4	Belle-Île-en-Mer	Brittany	5,426	85.63
5	Île d'Yeu	Pays de la Loire	4,850	23.32
6	Groix	Brittany	2,234	14.82
7	Ushant	Brittany	833	15.58
8	Île-Grande	Brittany	800	1.70
9	Île-aux-Moines	Brittany	620	3.20
10	Île de Batz	Brittany	452	3.05
11	Île-de-Bréhat	Brittany	352	3.09
12	Île de Sein	Brittany	260	0.58
13	Île-d'Arz	Brittany	227	3.3
14	Houat	Brittany	216	2.91
15	Île-d'Aix	Nouvelle-Aquitaine	207	1.19
16	Molène	Brittany	160	0.75
17	Hœdic	Brittany	94	2.08
18	Grande-Île, Chausey	Normandy	30	0.45
19	Mont Saint-Michel	Normandy	29	0.07

==== Normandy ====
- Chausey
  - Grande-Île
- Mont Saint-Michel (by very high tide)
- Tombelaine (tidal)
- Tatihou (high tide)
- Îles Saint-Marcouf
  - Île de Large
  - Île de Terre

==== Brittany ====
===== Ille-et-Vilaine =====
- Saint-Malo Islands
  - Cézembre
  - Grand Bé
  - Petit Bé
  - Fort National
  - La Conchée
- Île Harbour
- Île Agot
- Île des Landes
- Ébihens Archipelago
- Île du Guesclin
- Les Tintiaux
- Islands of Cancale:
  - Île des Landes
  - Île des Rimains

===== Côtes-d'Armor =====
- Île Aganton
- Bréhat archipelago
  - Île Béniguet
  - Bréhat
  - Île Logodec
  - Île à Bois
  - Île Ebihens
  - Île d'Er
  - Le Grand-Pourier
  - Île-Grande
  - Île Illiec
  - Île Lemenez
  - Île Loaven
  - Île Maudez
  - Mez de Goëlo
  - Île Milliau
  - Île Saint-Gildas
  - Îlot Saint-Michel
  - Île Saint-Riom
- Sept Îles archipelago
  - Ar Moudennoù
  - Île Bonno
  - Le Cerf
  - Les Costans
  - Malban
  - Île aux Moines
  - Île Plate
  - Île aux Rats
  - Rouzic
  - Le Taureau
  - Île Tomé
  - Île Verdelet

===== Finistère =====
- Île de Batz
- Île Callot
- Île Carn
- Île Garo
- Glénan islands
  - Île Saint-Nicolas
  - Île Guenioc
  - Île d'Iock
  - Île de Keller
  - Île Melon
- Molène Archipelago
  - Île de Balaneg
  - Île de Banneg
  - Île de Beniguet
  - Île de Litiri
  - Lédénès de Molène
  - Lédénès de Quéménès
  - Molène
  - Île de Morgol
  - Île de Quéménès
  - Île de Trielen
  - Île aux Moutons
  - Ushant (Ouessant)
  - Île Raguenès
  - Île Ségal
  - Île de Sein
  - Île de Siec
  - Île Stagadon
  - Île Tariec
  - Île Verte

===== Morbihan =====
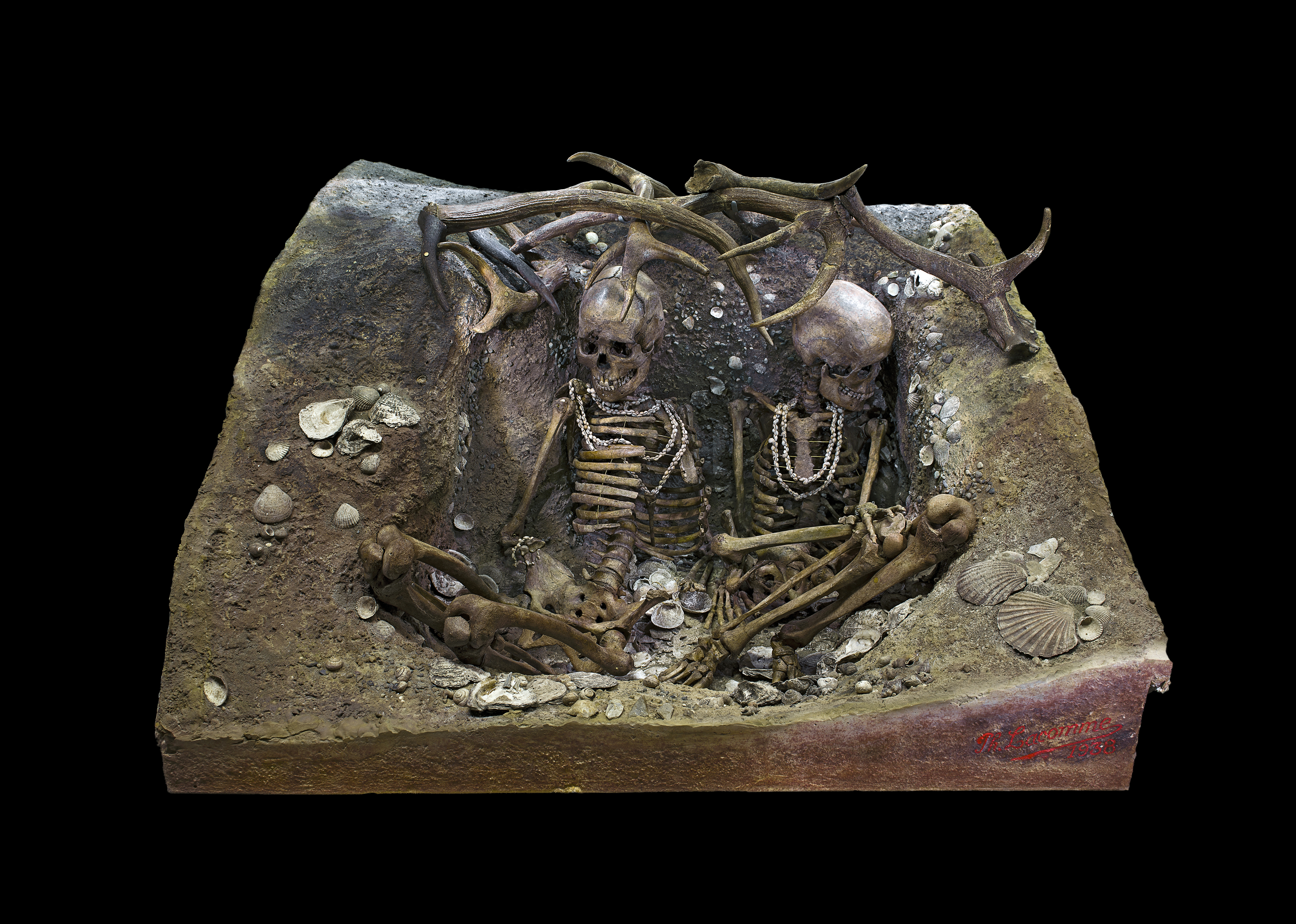
Tomb of Théviec, Île Théviec

- Île-d'Arz
- Île de Belair
- Belle-Île-en-Mer
- Les Grands Cardinaux
- Les Petits Cardinaux
- Île aux Chevaux (Morbihan)
- Île Glazic
- Groix
- Hoëdic
- Houat
- Méaban
- Les Poulains
- Île Théviec
- Île Valhuec
- In the Gulf of Morbihan
  - Île-d'Arz
  - Île de Bailleron
  - Île de Berder
  - Boëd
  - Boëdic
  - Brannec
  - Île du Charles
  - Conleau
  - Creizic
  - Danlen
  - Le Dervenn
  - Îles Drenec
  - Er Lannic
  - Gavrinis
  - Godec
  - Govihan
- Îles Harnic
  - Grand Harnic
  - Petit Harnic
  - Holavre
  - Ilur
  - Iluric
  - Irus
  - Île de la Jument
  - Île de Lern
- Îles Logoden
  - Grand Logoden
  - Petit Logoden
  - Île Longue
  - Île de Mancel
  - Île aux Moines
  - Mouchiouse
  - Île aux Oiseaux
  - Piren
  - Pladic
  - Île de la Pointe
  - Quistinic
  - Radenec
  - Île Reno
  - Sept Îles
  - Stibiden
  - Île Tascon
  - Trohennec
- Îles Vézid
  - Grand Vézid
  - Petit Vézid

==== Pays de la Loire ====
Loire-Atlantique
- Île Dumet
- Les Évens

Vendée

- Les Chiens Perrins
- Île de Noirmoutier
- Île du Pilier
- Île d'Yeu

==== Poitou-Charentes ====
- Île d'Aix
- Fort Boyard
- Fort Enet
- Île Madame
- Île d'Oléron
- Île de Ré

==== Aquitaine ====
- Banc d'Arguin
- Île aux oiseaux (in Arcachon Bay)
- Phare de Cordouan

=== Mediterranean coast ===
==== Languedoc-Roussillon ====
- Fort de Brescou

==== Provence-Alpes-Côte-d'Azur ====
Îles d'Hyères
- Île de Bagaud
- Île du Grand Ribaud
- Île du Levant
- Porquerolles
- Port-Cros
- Îlot de la Gabinière

Îles de Lérins

- île Sainte-Marguerite
- île Saint-Honorat
- îlot Saint-Ferréol

Îles marseillaises

- Île Calseraigne
- Congloué
- Île de Planier

Archipel du Frioul

- If
- Pomègues
- Ratonneau
- Île Tiboulen

Archipel de Riou

- Île de Riou
- Île de Jarre
- Île du Jarron
- Île Maïre and île Tiboulen de Maïre
- Île Moyade and les Moyadons
- Île Calseraigne or île Plane
- Esteou
- Île du petit Gougloué and Île de Grand-Congloué
- Îlots des Impériaux
- les Pharillons

Îles des Embiez:

- Île du Grand Gaou
- Les Fourmigues
- Camargue (dozens of islands)
- Île Aragnon
- Île Verte (La Ciotat)
- Bendor (Bandol)
- Le Lion de mer
- Le Lion de terre
- Île d'Or
- Île des Vieilles
- Rocher du torpilleur

==== Corsica ====
- Île Bruzzi
- Île de Cavallo
- Îles Cerbicale
- Île de Gargalo
- Corsica
- Île de Pinarellu
- Îles Lavezzi
- Îlots des Moines
- Île Roscana
- Îles Sanguinaires

=== Islands in lakes and rivers ===
==== Alsace ====
- Grande Île, in Strasbourg on the Ill River

==== Île-de-France ====
- Île l'Aumône, on the Seine River
- Île du Belvédère
- Île de la Cité, in Paris on the Seine River
- Île aux Cygnes, in Paris on the Seine River
- Île aux Dames, on the Seine River
- Île de la Jatte, on the Seine River
- Île de Reuilly
- Île-Saint-Denis, on the Seine River
- Île Saint-Germain, on the Seine River
- Île Saint-Louis, in Paris on the Seine River
- Île Seguin, on the Seine River

==== Midi-Pyrénées ====
- Île du Ramier, in Toulouse on the Garonne River

==== Pays de la Loire ====
- Île de Nantes, in Nantes on the Loire River
- Béhuard, in the Loire River

== Overseas islands ==
=== Antarctica ===
==== Adélie Land ====
- Archipel de Pointe Géologie
- Île Alexis Carrel
- Île Buffon
- Île Claude Bernard
- Île Curie
- Île Cuvier
- Île de la Vierge
- Île des Damiers
- Île des Pétrels
- Île du Bélier
- Île du Capricorne
- Île du Gouverneur
- Île du Lion
- Île du Navigateur
- Île du Sagittaire
- Île du Scorpion
- Île du Taureau
- Île Jean Rostand
- Île Lamarck
- Île Verte
- Îles des Poissons
- Îlot de la Balance
- Îlot de la Baleine
- Îlot de la Dent
- Îlot de la Selle
- Îlot des Champignons
- Îlot du Cancer
- Îlot du Marégraphe
- Îlot du Mystère
- Îlot du Verseau
- Îlot Juliette
- Îlot Roméo
- Îlots des Hydrographes
- Le Mauguen
- Mid-Winter
- Rocher Gris

==== Crozet Islands ====
- Îles des Apôtres
- Île aux cochons
- Île de l'Est
- Île des pingouins
- Île de la possession

==== Kerguelen Islands ====
- Île Australia
- Îlot Ballouard
- Île Bethell
- Île Channer
- Île Clugny
- Îlots Davis
- Île Foch
- Île Gaby
- Grande Terre
- Île Haute
- Île Howe
- Îles Leygues (or Iles Swains)
  - Île de Castries
  - Île Dauphine
- Île Longue
- Île Macmurdo
- Île Maroon
- Îles Nuageuses
  - Île de Croy
  - Île Roland
  - Îles Ternay
- Île de l'Ouest
- Île du Port
- Îles du Prince-de-Monaco
- Île Ronde
- Île Saint-Lanne Gramont
- Île Swains (see Iles Leygues)
- Île Violette

==== Saint Paul and Amsterdam Islands ====
- Île Amsterdam
- Île Saint-Paul

=== Indian Ocean ===
==== Mayotte ====
- Île Bambo
- Île Bouzi
- Île Brandélé
- Îles Choazil
- Grande-Terre (or Mahoré)
- Îles Hajangoua
- Île Handréma
- Île Mtsamboro
- Petite Terre (or Île Pamanzi)

==== Réunion ====
- Réunion

==== Scattered Islands ====
- Banc du Geyser
- Bassas da India
- Glorioso Islands
  - Île Glorieuse (or Grande Glorieuse)
  - Île du Lys (or Petite Glorieuse)
  - Les Roches Vertes
- Europa Island
- Juan de Nova
- Tromelin Island

=== North America ===
==== Guadeloupe ====
- Basse-Terre
  - Îlet à Cochons
  - Îlet Boissard
  - Îlet Chasse
  - Îlet Feuille
  - Îlet à l'anglais (submerged)
  - Îlet à Nègre
  - Îlets à Cabrit
  - Grand Îlet
  - Îlet à la Breche (submerged)
  - Îlet à la Hache (submerged)
  - Îlet Frégate de Bas (submerged)
  - Îlet Frégate de Haut (submerged)
  - Îlet Saint-Hilaire
  - Îlet Yonka (submerged)
  - Îlet Tomé (submerged)
  - Îlet Fortune
  - Îlets de Pigeon (or à Goyaves)
  - Jeantoutou Rocher
  - Îlet à Kahouanne
  - Îlet des Petits Pompons
  - Îlet Le Boyer
  - Îlet Blanc
  - Îlets de Carénage
  - Îlet La Biche
  - Îlet Crabière
  - Îlet Caret
  - Îlet Fajou
  - Îlet à Colas
  - Îlet Mangle à Laurette
  - Îlet à Christophe
- Grande-Terre
  - Îlet de Gosier
  - Îlet Rat
  - Îlet Macou
  - Îlet Duberan
  - Îlet de la Voute
  - Îlet Maurice
  - Îlet L'éperon
  - Rocher La Roche (Pointe des Chateaux)
  - Rocher Le Souffleur (Pointe des Chateaux)
- La Désirade
  - Îlet de la Rivière
  - Îlet Pirogue
  - Îlets Grand Banc
  - Gros Îlet
- Marie-Galante
  - Îlet du Vieux Fort
- Les Saintes
  - Îlet à Cabrit
  - Grand Îlet
  - La Coche
  - Les Augustins
  - La Redonde
  - Le Paté
  - Terre-de-Bas
  - Terre-de-Haut
- Petite Terre
  - Terre de Bas
  - Terre de Haut

==== Martinique ====
- Martinique
- Îlet Chevalier
- Îlet Long
- Rocher du Diamant
- Rocher de la Perle
- Gros Îlet
- Îlet Ramiers
- Îlet Saint-Aubin
- Îlet Sainte-Marie
- Îlet à Aigrettes
- Îlet Cabrits
- Îlet aux Chiens
- Îlet Duquesnay
- Îlet Hardy
- Îlet Poirier
- La Table du Diable
- Îlet Frégate
- Îlet Métrente
- Îlet Oscar
- Îlet Thierry
- Îlet Boisseau
- Îlet Chancel
- Îlet des Chardons
- Îlet à Eau
- Loup-Garou
- Îlet Madame
- Îlet Petite Martinique
- Îlet Petit Piton
- Îlet Ragot
- Îlet aux Rats
- Îlet Petit Vincent
- Îlet Petite Grenade

==== Saint Barthélemy ====
- Saint Barthélemy

==== Saint Martin ====
- Saint Martin (shared with the Kingdom of the Netherlands)
- Île Tintamarre

==== Saint Pierre and Miquelon ====
- Grand Colombier
- Langlade
- L'Île-aux-Marins
- Miquelon
- Île aux Pigeons
- Saint Pierre Island
- Île aux Vainqueurs
- Green Island (Fortune), Newfoundland and Labrador ("Île Verte") (uncertain sovereignty between France and Canada)

=== Oceania ===
==== Clipperton Island ====
- Clipperton Island

==== French Polynesia ====
- Austral Islands (Îles Australes)
  - Tubuai Islands (Îles Tubuaï)
    - Raivavae
    - Rimatara
    - Rurutu
    - Îles Maria
    - Tubuai
  - Bass Islands (Îles Bass)
    - Rapa
    - Marotiri
- Marquesas Islands (Îles Marquises)
  - Northern Marquesas
    - Eiao
    - Hatutu
    - Motu Iti
    - Motu Oa
    - Motu One
    - Nuku Hiva
    - Ua Huka
    - Ua Pou
  - Southern Marquesas
    - Fatu Hiva
    - Fatu Huku
    - Hiva Oa
    - Moho Tani
    - Motu Nao
    - Tahuata
    - Terihi
- Society Islands (Îles de la Société)
  - Leeward Islands (Îles Sous-le-Vent)
    - Bora Bora
    - Huahine
    - Manuae
    - Maupihaa
    - Maupiti
    - Motu One
    - Raiatea
    - Tahaa
    - Tupai
  - Windward Islands (Îles du Vent)
    - Maiao
    - Mehetia
    - Moorea
    - Tahiti
    - Tetiaroa
- Tuamotu Archipelago - Gambier Islands (Îles Tuamotu-Gambier)
  - King George Islands (Îles du Roi Georges)
    - Ahe
    - Manihi
    - Takaroa
    - Takapoto
    - Tikei
  - Palliser Islands (Îles Palliser)
    - Fakarava
    - Niau
    - Toau
    - Arutua
    - Apataki
    - Kaukura
    - Mataiva
    - Tikehau
    - Rangiroa
    - Makatea
  - Raeffsky Islands (Îles Raéffsky)
    - Anaa
    - Faaite
    - Tahanea
    - Motutunga
    - Takume
    - Raroia
    - Taenga
    - Nihiru
    - Makemo
    - Katiu
    - Tuanake
    - Hiti
    - Tepoto (South) (Tepoto Sud)
    - Marutea Nord
    - Haraiki
    - Aratika
    - Kauehi
    - Taiaro
    - Raraka
  - Disappointment Islands (Îles du Désappointement)
    - Puka-Puka
    - Napuka
    - Tepoto (North) (Tepoto Nord)
  - Duke of Gloucester Islands (Îles du Duc de Gloucester)
    - Hereheretue
    - Anuanuraro
    - Anuanurunga
    - Nukutepipi
  - Hao Groups
    - Rekareka (Tehuata)
    - Tauere
    - Amanu
    - Hao
    - Paraoa
    - Nengonengo
    - Manuhangi
    - Ahunui
  - Hikueru Groups
    - Tekokota
    - Hikueru
    - Reitoru
    - Marokau
    - Ravahere
  - Far East Group
    - Fangatau
    - Fakahina
    - Tatakoto
    - Akiaki
    - Vahitahi
    - Nukutavake
    - Vairaatea
    - Pinaki
    - Reao
    - Pukarua
    - Vanavana
    - Tureia
    - Tematangi
    - Moruroa
    - Fangataufa
  - Gambier Islands (Îles Gambier)
    - Acteon Group (Groupe Actéon)
      - Matureivavao
      - Tenararo
      - Tenarunga
      - Vahanga
    - Gambier Group
      - Akamaru
      - Angakauitai
      - Aukena
      - Kamaka
      - Kouaku
      - Makapu
      - Makaroa
      - Mangareva
      - Manui
      - Mekiro
      - Papuri
      - Puaumu
      - Taravai
      - Tokorua
      - Totengengie
    - Marutea Sud (Marutea South)
    - Maria Est (Maria East)
    - Morane
    - Temoe

==== New Caledonia ====
- Récifs de l'Astrolabe
- Atoll Beautemps-Beaupré
- Belep
  - Art Island
  - Île Balabio
  - Île Paaba
  - Île Pott
  - Île Yande
- Recifs Bellona
- Îles Chesterfield
- Récifs d'Entrecasteaux
- Récif Fairway
- Grande Terre
- île Huon
- Île Kanawa
- Île Kumo
- Îles Loyauté
  - Dudun Island
  - Faiava Island
  - Lifou Island
  - Maré Island
  - Mouli Island
  - Ouvéa Island
  - Tiga Island
- Récif Petrie
- Île de Sable
- Isle of Pines
- Kôtomo Island
- Walpole Island
- Hunter Island (disputed with Vanuatu)
- Matthew Island (disputed with Vanuatu)

==== Wallis and Futuna ====
- Îles de Horne
  - Alofi
  - Futuna
- Îles Wallis
  - Faioa
  - Fenuafo'ou
  - Fugalei
  - Luaniva
  - Nukuatea
  - Nukufotu
  - Nukuhifala
  - Nukuloa
  - Nukunione
  - Nukutapu
  - Nukuteatea
  - Wallis

=== South America ===
==== French Guiana ====
- Îles du Salut
  - Île du Diable
  - Île Royale
  - Île Saint-Joseph
- Îlets de Rémire
  - Îlet la Mère
- Constable Islands
- Île Portal
- Île Bastien
- Îlet Bastien
- Île Pimpin
- Île de la Quarantine
- Îlet Saint-Louis
- Arouaba Noord
- Ayawande
- Santi Tabiki
- Gaan Tabiki
- Îlet Coumouri
- Îlet Gros Indien
- Îlet Mula

== See also ==
- List of Antarctic and subantarctic islands
- List of Caribbean islands
- List of French islands in the Indian and Pacific oceans
- List of islands
- List of islands in the Arctic Ocean
- List of islands in the Atlantic Ocean
- List of islands in the Indian Ocean
- List of islands in the Pacific Ocean
