= Île Aucard =

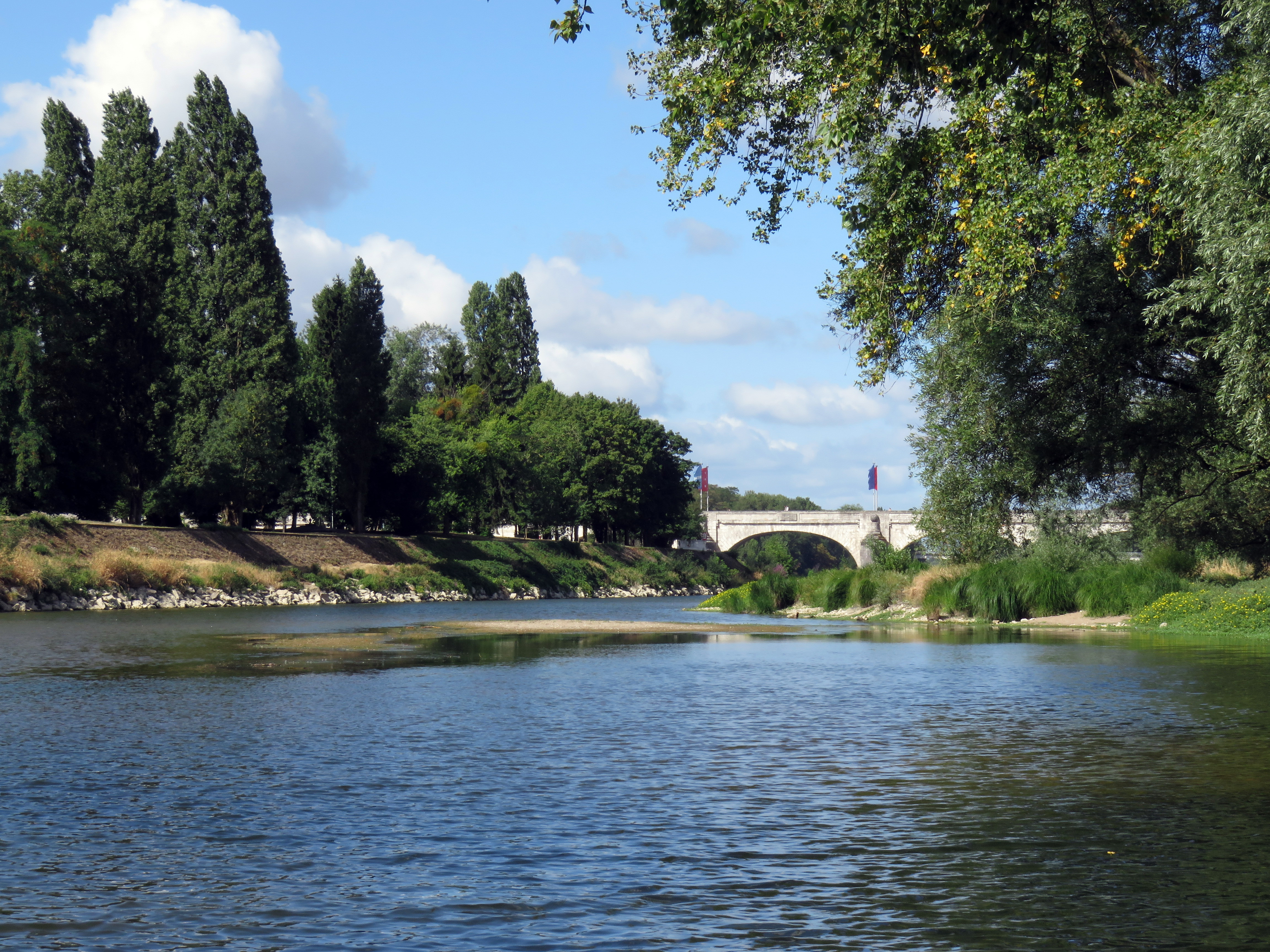
- Île Aucard with Wilson Bridge (Pont Wilson) in the background

Geography
- Location: Loire River
- Coordinates: 47°24′02″N 0°41′24″E
- Area: 0.8 km^{2} (0.31 sq mi)

Administration
- France
- Region: Centre-Val de Loire
- Department: Indre-et-Loire
- Commune: Tours

Additional information
- Time zone: CET (UTC+01:00)

Île Aucard is an island on the Loire river, administratively belonging to the commune of Tours, France.

== Description ==
The island extends approximately 920 meters in length and about 200 meters at its widest point, with a maximum elevation of 52 meters. Crossed by the Saint-Symphorien suspension bridge, the island hosts a municipal stadium bearing its name.

Located within the embanked riverbed, the island is subject to flooding during major floods of the Loire. Such an event notably occurred in 1941.

== History ==
Remains of the ancient bridge on Île Aucard.

During the Late Roman Empire, a wooden bridge, faint remains of which are still visible, crossed the Loire at the eastern part of the island, although its existence at that time is uncertain.

The medieval bridge of Tours, constructed in the 11th century, rested on two islands named Île Saint-Maurice and Île de l'Entrepont, which are likely the same as today's Île Aucard. The island acquired its current name from Louis Aucard, who used it for grazing cattle at the beginning of the 16th century, when it belonged to the chapter of the church of Tours. Its area was originally 23 arpents, but by the eve of the French Revolution, erosion from the Loire had reduced its surface to two arpents.

After the ruined medieval bridge was demolished starting in 1876, Île Aucard became a support for several piers of the Saint-Symphorien footbridge, built nearly in the same location and opened in 1847.

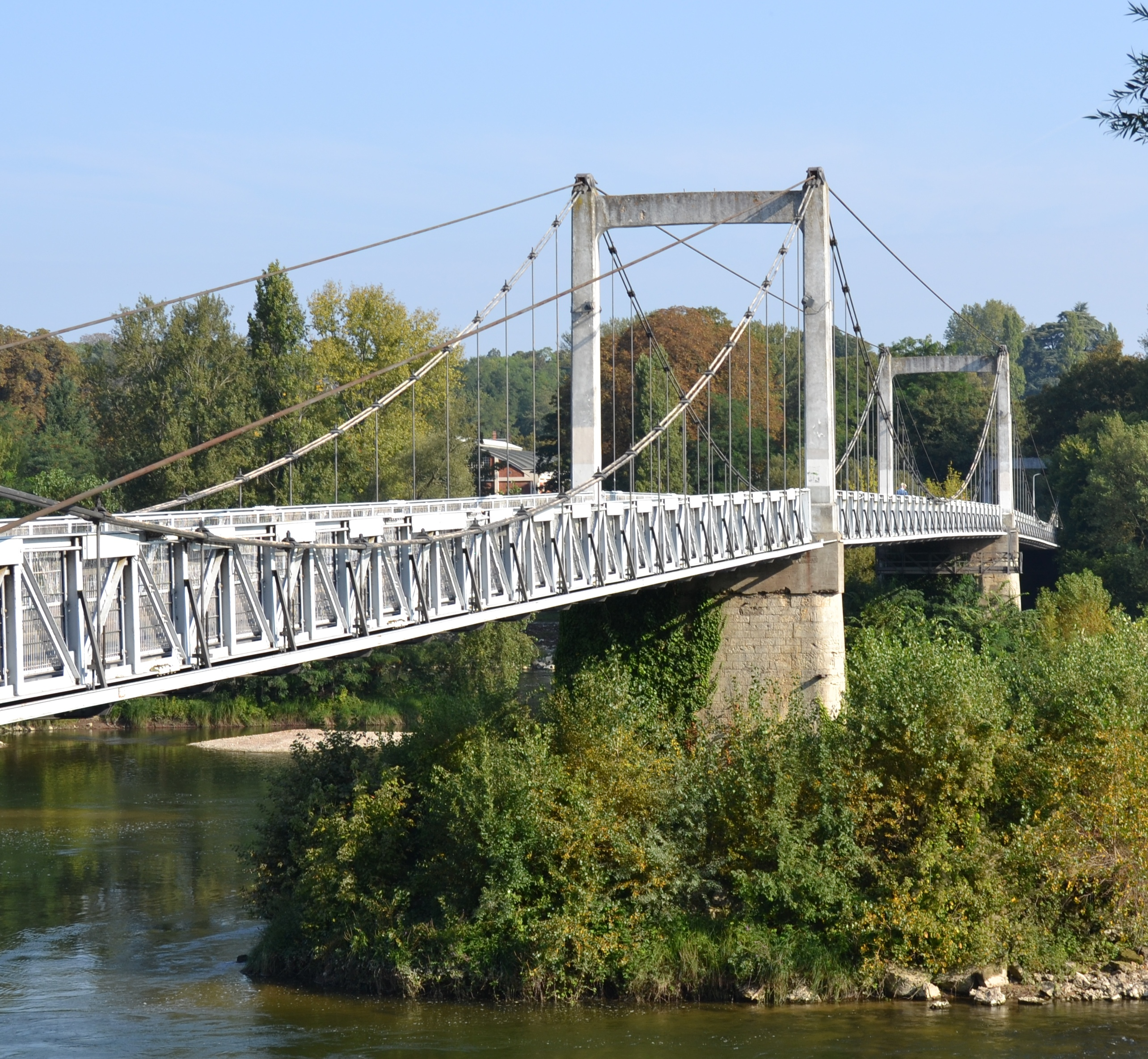
The Saint-Symphorien footbridge with Île Aucard in the background.

Drinking water supply for Tours is partly provided by a pumping station on Île Aucard, extracting water from both an alluvial aquifer beneath the river and a deeper borehole reaching the Cenomanian aquifer. The station became operational in 1933, with initial groundwater surveys conducted as early as 1909.

During World War II, the island hosted French troops before being occupied by German forces in 1940. On 20 June 1940, the prefect of Indre-et-Loire and the mayor of Tours met German authorities there for initial negotiations about the city's status. The archbishop of Tours and a French military officer accompanied them.

The island is used for sports and occasionally hosts the Aucard de Tours music festival, notably in August 2016, when flooding prevented its usual location at La Gloriette.

== See also ==
- List of islands of France
