= Raeffsky Islands =

Island group in French Polynesia

Coordinates: 16.750°S 144.217°W

Location of the Raeffsky Islands in the Pacific Ocean

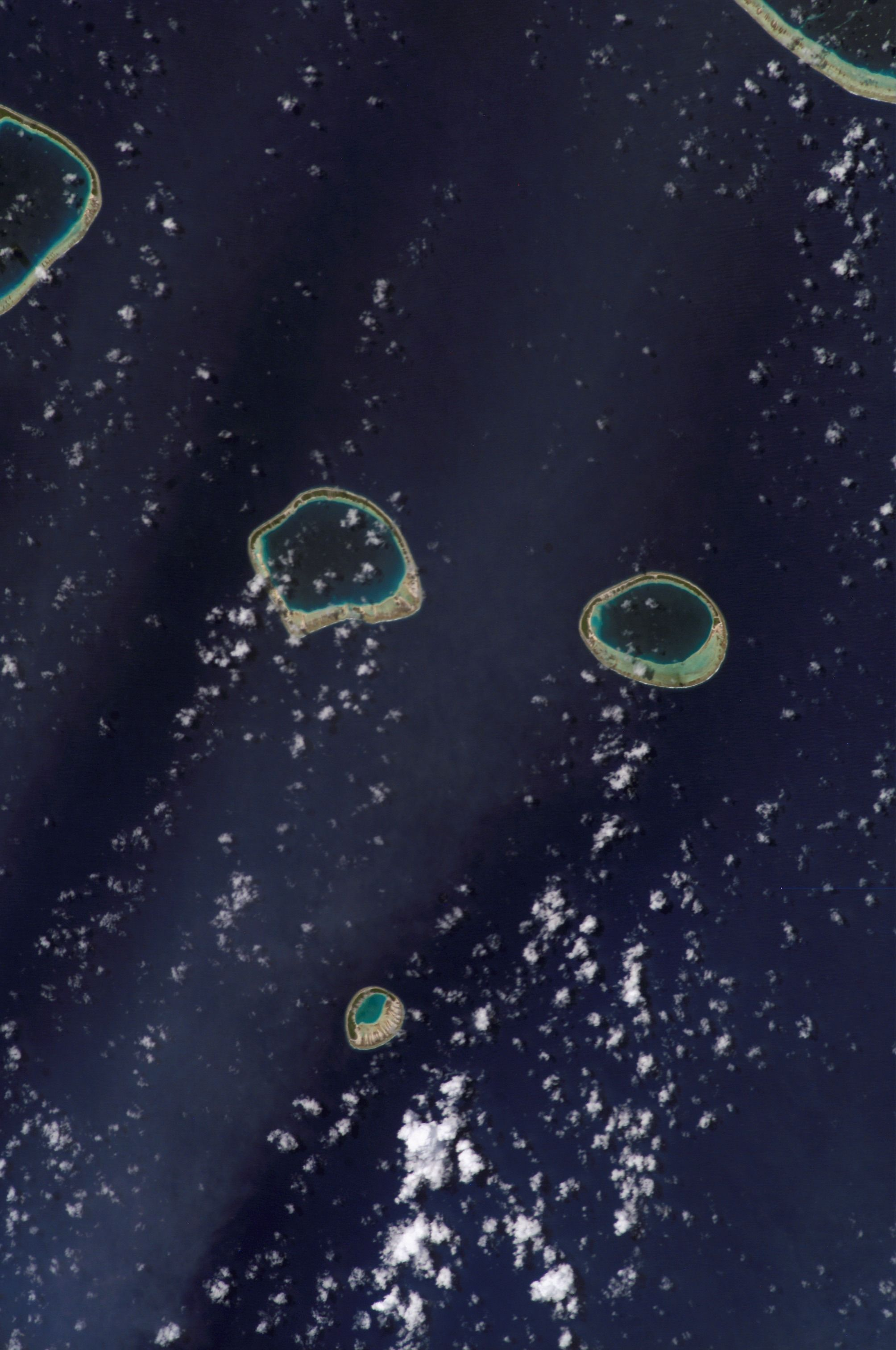
NASA picture of the Raeffsky Islands.

The Raeffsky Islands or Raevski Islands (French: Îles Raéffsky or Îles Raevski) is a subgroup of the Tuamotus in French Polynesia, which includes the uninhabited atolls of Hiti, Tepoto and Tuanake. They are located roughly in the central area of the main Tuamotu atoll cluster. (Latitude: 16° 45' 0 S, Longitude: 144° 13' 60 W.) Named after Nikolay Raevsky, a Russian general of the Napoleonic wars.
