= Margaret (1799 brig) =

English ship wrecked in 1803

History
- Launched: 1799
- Fate: Wrecked 17 April 1803

General characteristics
- Class & type: Brig
- Tons burthen: 121 (bm)
- Propulsion: sail
- Complement: 15 men
- Armament: 10 × 2 and 3-pounder guns
- Notes: Built of English oak

Margaret was a British-built Australian brig that was launched in 1799 and wrecked in 1803.

Margaret was constructed in London in 1799 and registered to a company called Turnbull & Co. John Buyers, as her master, received a letter of marque on 28 May 1800. Buyers and John Turnbull, who had known each other from a 1799 voyage to China on the Barwell, entered a venture with some London merchants to explore trade options. Margaret left London on 2 July 1801 and arrived in Sydney in February 1802. Buyers and Margaret left Sydney on 5 June 1802, bound for the Society Islands on a seal hunting expedition. Along the voyage the ship was the first European to discover both Makemo, Taenga, and rediscover Nukutepipi in March 1803. On 17 April 1803 the Margaret was grounded on a reef. The crew cut away her mast but by midnight they had to abandon ship. The crew reached shore in a small boat, which natives promptly stole; also, natives speared two of the crew. The crew constructed two small boats from the wreck and sailed off the island, eventually making it back to Sydney by 30 September 1803.
