= John Buyers =

British first officer of the brig Barwell

John Buyers was the British first officer of the brig Barwell in 1799 on her voyage to China. Later he was the first officer of the brig Margaret as an investment he and John Turnbull made in Turnbull and Co., John Turnbull being his second officer and a historian. The Margaret, after some delay, left England on 2 July 1800, and sailing by way of the Cape of Good Hope, reached Sydney in February 1801. They reached the Society Islands and anchored in Matavai Bay, Tahiti, on 24 September 1802. After spending one month in Tahiti, Turnbull and Buyers sailed to Huahine, where they were warmly received by the local chiefs. They continued on to Ra'iātea, where they met King Tamatoa III and Tapoa I, the ruler of Taha'a and commander of the joint forces of Ra'iātea and Taha'a in time of war During their stay, tensions rose as certain chiefs conspired with convicts to seize their ship, the Margaret. Thanks to the vigilance of the crew and the captain's timely intervention, the ship was saved from the plot and returned to sea, although it lost two anchors and their cables in the process. After departing Ra'iātea, they sailed past Bora Bora without engaging its inhabitants and later established contact with the natives of Maupiti. The ship then sailed for the Hawaiian Islands, arriving at Oahu on 17 December. After trading for salt at Oahu, Kauai, Niihau, and Hawaiʻi island, the Margaret sailed south on 21 January 1803. The ship sailed in among the Tuamotuan atolls and, on 6 March 1803, Nukutepipi, one of the Duke of Gloucester Islands, was visited and named Margaret Island, after the ship, though previously discovered in 1767. On 10 March Makemo was discovered and named Phillips Island, after a late sheriff of London, Sir Richard Phillips. On the same day, Taenga was discovered and named Holts Island. Some other islands were sighted but they had been previously discovered and were not landed on.

On March 21, 1803, the Margaret anchored at Matavai Bay, where Mr. Turnbull and a small party disembarked to establish a shore-based operation for procuring pigs and preserving them using salt previously obtained in the Hawaiian Islands. Meanwhile, on April 1, Captain Buyers proceeded with the vessel to conduct a survey of the Tuamotu Islands formerly called Pearl Islands, to renew the trade in pearls, the principal objective of his voyage. On April 17, at approximately 10:30 p.m., while steering northeast under a moderate breeze from the east-southeast, the Margaret failed to stay upon maneuvering and ran aground on a low reef of rocks and sandbanks, in the vicinity of a cluster of islands known as the Palliser Islands, at latitude 15° 38′ south and longitude 146° 30′ west. These islands had not previously been charted. Shortly thereafter, low-lying land was observed ahead, at an estimated distance of one and a half miles. In response to the emergency, the crew cut away the masts, and by 12:30 a.m., they were compelled to abandon the vessel and seek refuge on a nearby sand islet. Complications intensified when the ship's boat was stolen by two Tahitians natives who had been taken aboard, rendering it irrecoverable. With no immediate means of escape, the crew dismantled the deck to construct a makeshift vessel. However, upon completion, no navigable passage could be found through the surrounding reef, which was circular in formation and of considerable extent. During attempts to locate an outlet to the open ocean, the wreck was boarded and stripped by natives from several neighboring islands. Despite continuous threats from hostile islanders—during which two crew members sustained spear wounds while on guard—the survivors persevered in building a second vessel. Through sustained exertion and under constant duress, all individuals, including Mrs. Wood (wife of Mr. Wood, the vessel's mate) and her infant child, succeeded in returning to Tahiti on May 27, though in a severely reduced and weakened condition. The brig Dart, which called at Tahiti on August 27, 1803, afforded passage to Sydney for both Turnbull and Buyers. They took their final leave of Otaheite on the 2nd of September 1803.

They departed from Sydney aboard the Calcutta on 16 March 1804 and reached Spithead, England, via Cape Horn after an absence of four years and twenty-three days. Though a financial failure, the voyage obtained interesting information about the Society and Hawaiian Islands and the discovery of the islands Margaret, Phillips, and Holt in the Tuamotu Archipelago.
