= Nihiru =

Atoll in French Polynesia

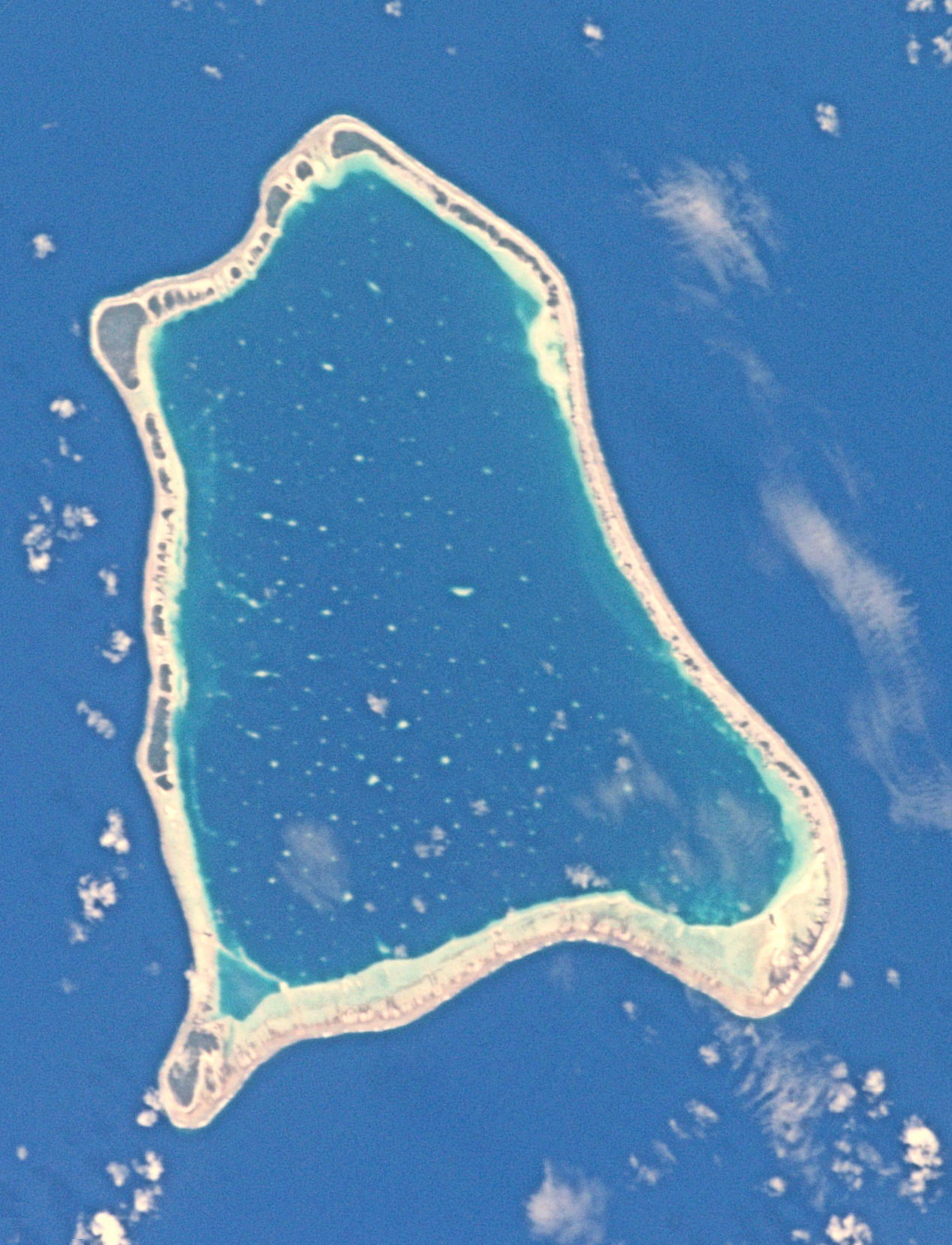
- NASA picture of Nihiru Atoll

- Location within French Polynesia

Geography
- Location: Pacific Ocean
- Coordinates: 16°44′S 142°50′W
- Archipelago: Tuamotus
- Area: 79 km^{2} (31 sq mi) (lagoon); 20 km^{2} (8 sq mi) (above water)
- Length: 14 km (8.7 mi)
- Width: 10.5 km (6.52 mi)

Administration
- France
- Overseas collectivity: French Polynesia
- Administrative subdivision: Tuamotus
- Commune: Makemo

Demographics
- Population: 11 (2012)

Nihiru, or Niukia, is one of the Tuamotu atolls in French Polynesia. It is a relatively small atoll located 49 km to the east of Makemo Atoll and 30 km northeast of Marutea Atoll.

Nihiru Atoll is roughly triangular in shape. It measures 14 km in length with a maximum width of 10.5 km. Its lagoon has an area of 79 km^{2}.

Nihiru had 11 inhabitants in 2012, most of whom originated from Taenga.

== History ==
NASA picture of Nihiru Atoll.

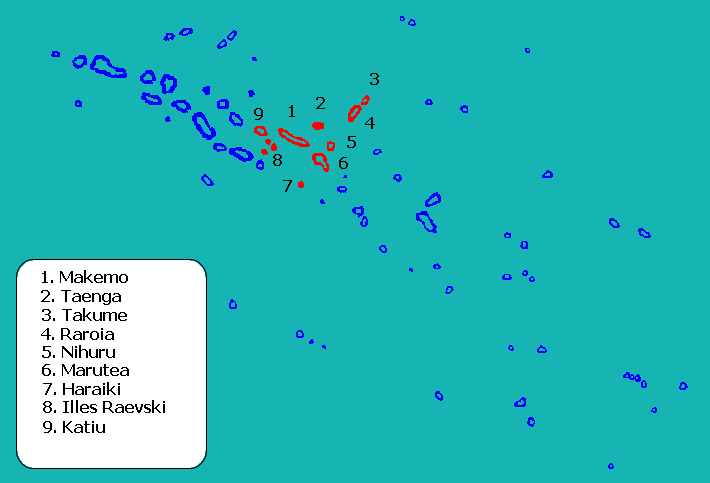
Location within Makemo Commune

The first recorded European to arrive to Nihiru was Russian oceanic explorer Fabian Gottlieb von Bellingshausen in 1820 on ships Vostok and Mirni. He named this atoll "Nigeri".

== Administration ==
Nihiru Atoll belongs to the commune of Makemo, which consists of the atolls of Makemo, Haraiki, Marutea Nord, Katiu, Tuanake, Hiti, Tepoto Sud, Raroia, Takume, Taenga and Nihiru.
