= Marutea Nord =

Atoll in French Polynesia

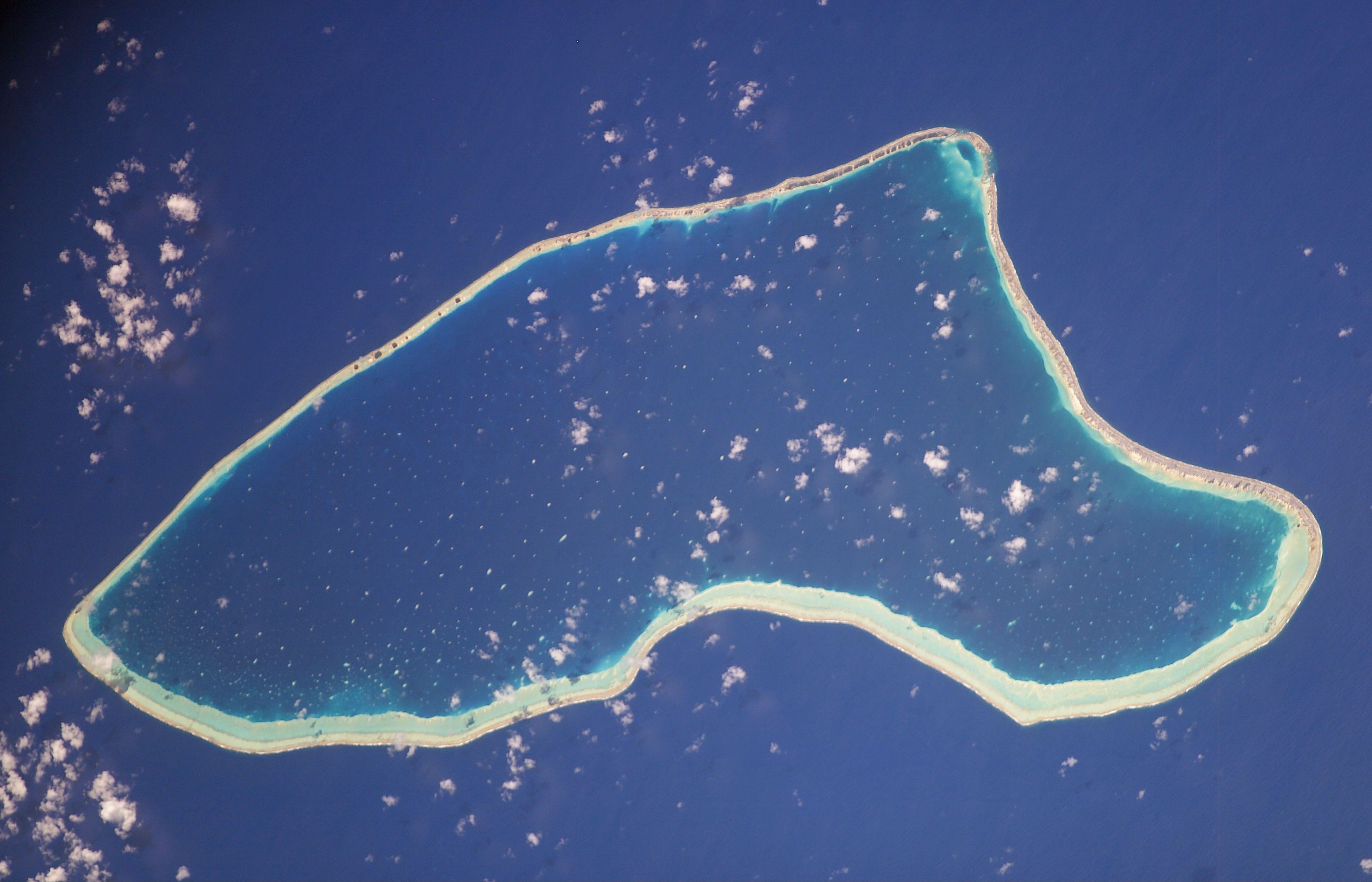
- NASA picture of Marutea Nord Atoll

- Location within French Polynesia

Geography
- Location: Pacific Ocean
- Coordinates: 17°07′S 143°11′W
- Archipelago: Tuamotus
- Area: 458 km^{2} (177 sq mi) (lagoon); 2.7 km^{2} (1.0 sq mi) (above water)
- Length: 42 km (26.1 mi)
- Width: 17 km (10.6 mi)

Administration
- France
- Overseas collectivity: French Polynesia
- Administrative subdivision: Tuamotus
- Commune: Makemo

Demographics
- Population: Uninhabited (2012)

Marutea, or Taunga tauranga-e-havana, is one of the Tuamotu atolls in French Polynesia. It is located 24 km to the southeast of Makemo Atoll and 30 km southwest of Nihiru Atoll.

Marutea Atoll measures 42 km in length with a maximum width of 17 km. Its lagoon has an area of 458 km^{2} and one pass to enter it. It has a land area of approx 2.7 km^{2}. This atoll is very low and its reef is often awash.

Marutea Atoll is permanently uninhabited.

Marutea Nord should not be confused with Marutea Sud located in the far south-eastern reaches of the Tuamotu Archipelago at 21˚ 30'S., 135˚ 32'W.

== History ==
Taunga-tauranga-e-havana, the second native name of Marutea, means "the friendly bird that rested and plumed itself on our mast" —so says Marerenui, a native of Faaite Atoll. There is a legend attached to this name, of which only fragments can be obtained.

The first recorded European to arrive to Marutea Atoll was Captain James Cook in 1773. Historically Marutea has appeared as "Furneaux Island" in some maps.

== Administration ==
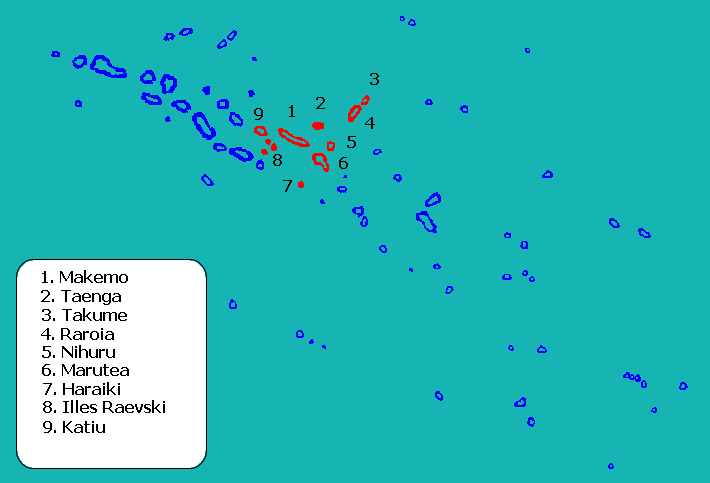
Location within Makemo Commune

Marutea Nord belongs to the commune of Makemo, which consists of the atolls of Makemo, Haraiki, Marutea Nord, Katiu, Tuanake, Hiti, Tepoto Sud, Raroia, Takume, Taenga and Nihiru.
