= Takume =

Atoll in French Polynesia

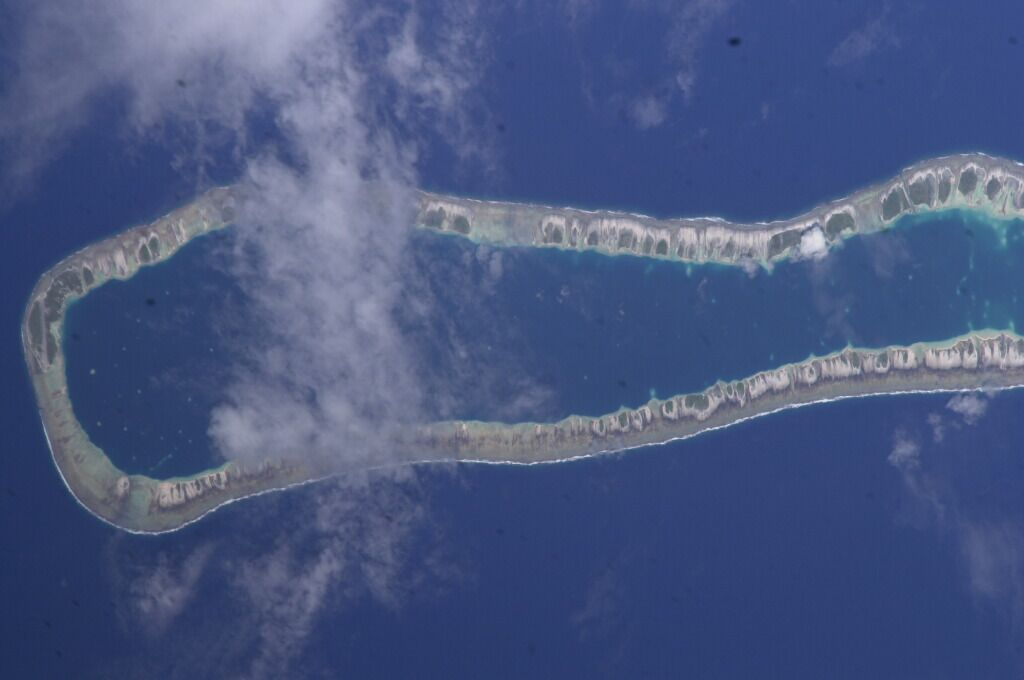
- NASA picture of Takume Atoll

- Location within French Polynesia

Geography
- Location: Pacific Ocean
- Coordinates: 15°48′S 142°12′W
- Archipelago: Tuamotus
- Area: 43.5 km^{2} (16.8 sq mi) (lagoon); 5 km^{2} (2 sq mi) (above water)
- Length: 24 km (14.9 mi)
- Width: 5 km (3.1 mi)

Administration
- France
- Overseas collectivity: French Polynesia
- Administrative subdivision: Tuamotus
- Commune: Makemo
- Largest settlement: Ohomo

Demographics
- Population: 116 (2012)

Takume or Pukamaru is an atoll of the Tuamotus chain in French Polynesia, located 790 km northeast of Tahiti and 6 km northeast of Raroia and 128 kilometres (80 miles) to the west of Fangatau.

This elongated atoll measures 24 by 5 kilometres (15 by 3 miles). Its lagoon has an area of 43.5 square kilometres (16.8 square miles)

Takume has many small motus on its reef; most are located on its eastern fringes. The long and deep lagoon has one navigable pass to enter it.

Takume Atoll has 116 inhabitants. The main village is Ohomo.

== History ==
Takume and Raroia were called Napaite, "the Twins" (ite, two), by the ancient Paumotu people.

The first recorded European who arrived to Amanu Atoll was Spanish navigator Pedro Fernández de Quirós on 15 February 1606, while sailing across the Pacific Ocean in search of Terra Australis. It was charted as La Fugitiva (The Fugitive in Spanish). In 1820 it was visited by the Russian Admiral oceanic explorer Fabian Gottlieb von Bellingshausen in 1820 on ships Vostok and Mirni. He named this atoll Atoll Wolkonsky after Pyotr Volkonsky.

Takume Airport was inaugurated in 1996.

== Administration ==
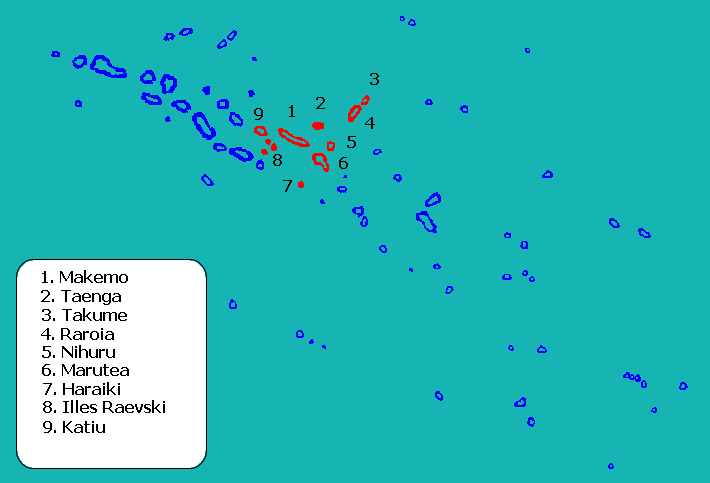
Location within Makemo Commune

Administratively Takume is a part of the commune of Makemo. The commune of Makemo consists of the atolls of Makemo, Haraiki, Marutea Nord, Katiu, Tuanake, Hiti, Tepoto Sud, Raroia, Takume, Taenga and Nihiru.
