= Raroia =

Atoll in French Polynesia

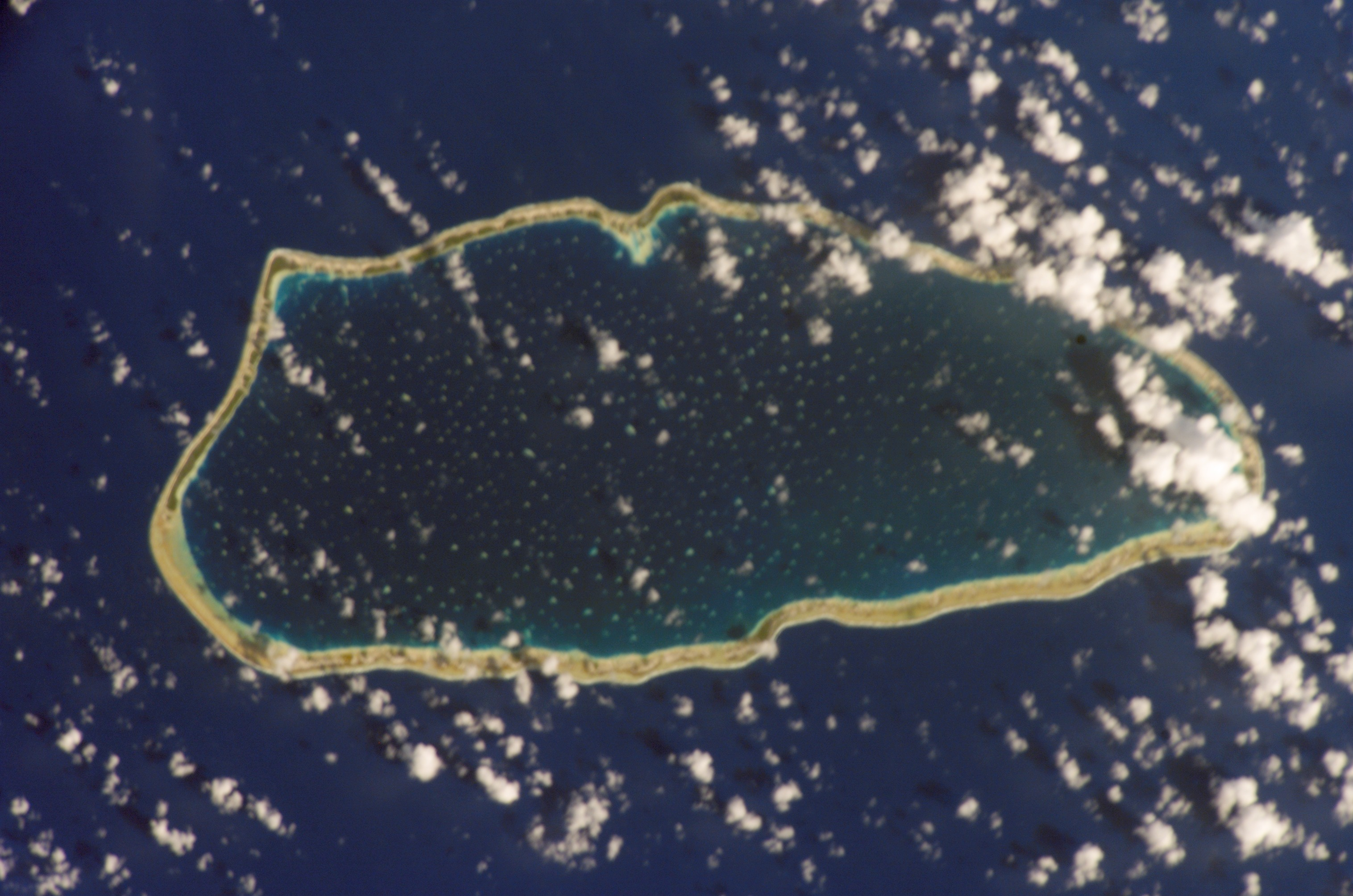
- NASA picture of Raroia Atoll
- Interactive map of Raroia

Geography
- Location: Pacific Ocean
- Coordinates: 16°01′S 142°26′W
- Archipelago: Tuamotus
- Area: 359 km^{2} (139 sq mi) (lagoon); 41 km^{2} (16 sq mi) (above water)
- Length: 43 km (26.7 mi)
- Width: 14 km (8.7 mi)

Administration
- France
- Overseas collectivity: French Polynesia
- Administrative subdivision: Tuamotus
- Commune: Makemo
- Largest settlement: Garumaoa

Demographics
- Population: 253 (2022)

Raroia, or Raro-nuku, is an atoll of the Tuamotus chain in French Polynesia, located 740 km northeast of Tahiti and 6 km southwest of Takume. Administratively it is a part of the commune of Makemo.

The oval-shaped atoll measures 43 km by 14 km and has a land area of 41 km^{2}. A navigable waterway leads to the central lagoon, which has an area of 359 km^{2}. The population as of the 2022 census was 253. The town of Garumaoa is the main settlement. Raroians live principally on fishing, copra cultivation, and pearl farming.

== History ==
Raroia and Takume were called Napaite, "the Twins" (-ite, two), by the ancient Paumotu people.

The first recorded Europeans to reach Raroia were those of the Spanish expedition led by the Portuguese explorer Pedro Fernandes de Queirós on 14 February 1606. The island was charted as La Fugitiva (the fugitive in Spanish). It was later sighted again in 1820 by Fabian Gottlieb von Bellingshausen, who named it Barclay de Tolly after the Russian field marshal Michael Andreas Barclay de Tolly.

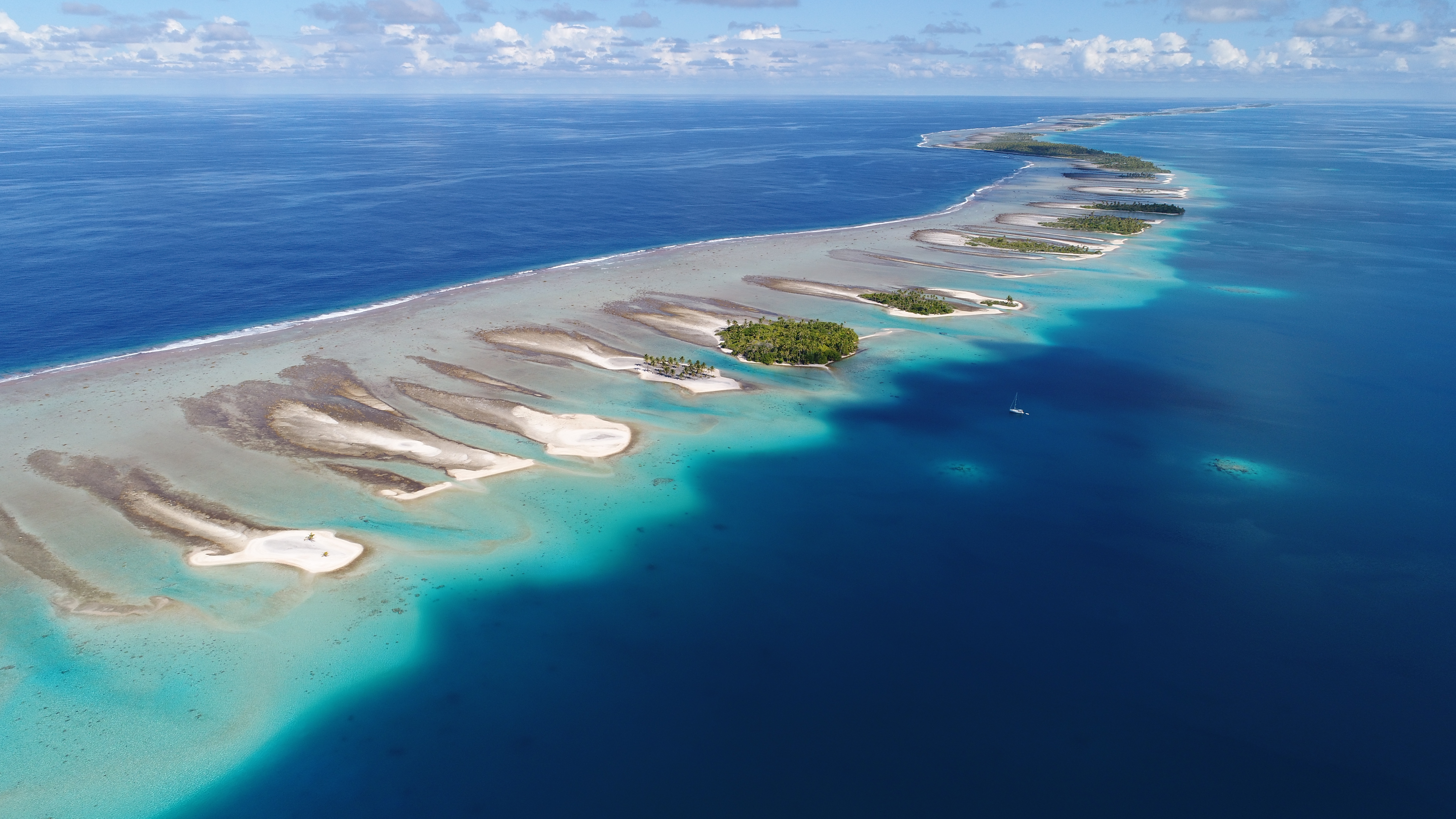
Raroia, from Kon-Tiki arrival site

In 1947, Thor Heyerdahl's Kon-Tiki raft arrived in Raroia after its 101-day journey from South America. Later, one of the crew members, Bengt Danielsson, lived there and studied the economy and the society. He wrote some books about Raroia, notably his thesis Work and Life on Raroia (Uppsala, 1955). In his 1952 book Raroia: Happy Island of the South Seas, he observes, "The Raroian peace stems from the fact that the people have no material anxieties and no other object in life than just to live" (Danielsson, 294).

In April 2006 Raroia Airport began serving the air transportation needs of the atoll, with irregular visits by Air Tahiti flights.

== Administration ==
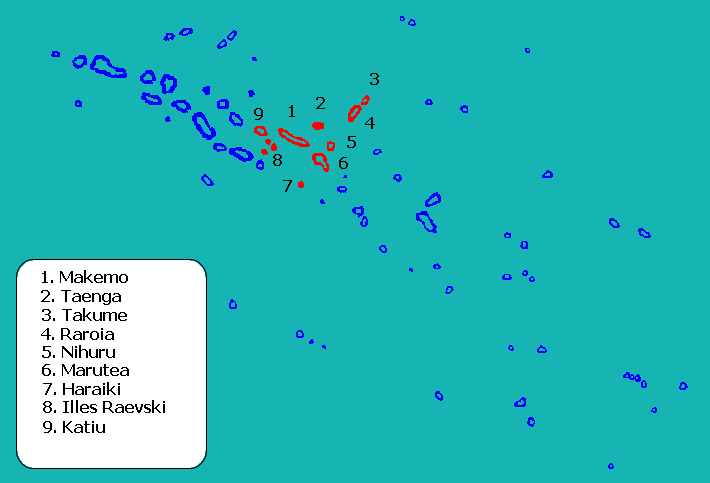
Location within Makemo Commune

Administratively Raroia is a part of the commune of Makemo. The commune of Makemo consists of the atolls of Makemo, Haraiki, Marutea Nord, Katiu, Tuanake, Hiti, Tepoto Sud, Raroia, Takume, Taenga and Nihiru.

== People ==
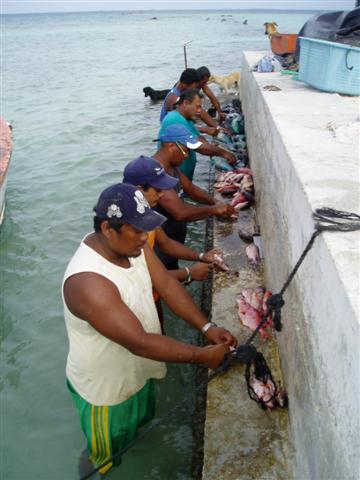
Raroians cleaning fish in Garumaoa

The languages spoken on Raroia are Pa'umotu and French. Pa'umotu is the local language, and French is taught in the elementary school in the island's village of Garumaoa. To attend secondary school the children go to the larger island Makemo. To attend university they can go to Tahiti, 748 km away. The Raroians are, like most Polynesians, known for their hospitality, and although there are no available accommodations to rent on the island, locals will often share their lodgings with travelers. The Raroian diet consists mainly of local seafood, imported bread, rice and canned goods. The island's main industries are pearl farming and copra cultivation.
