= Tuanake =

Atoll in French Polynesia

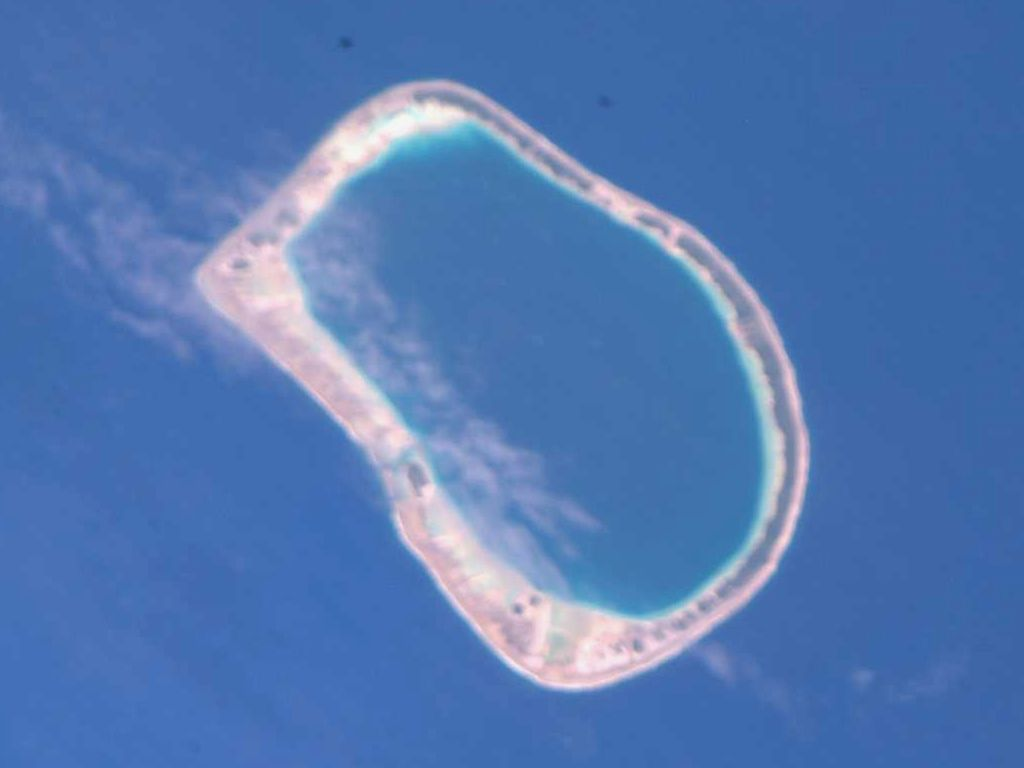
- NASA picture of Tuanake Atoll

- Location within French Polynesia

Geography
- Location: Pacific Ocean
- Coordinates: 16°40′S 144°13′W
- Archipelago: Tuamotus
- Area: 26 km^{2} (10 sq mi) (lagoon); 6 km^{2} (2 sq mi) (above water)
- Length: 9.5 km (5.9 mi)
- Width: 6.5 km (4.04 mi)

Administration
- France
- Overseas collectivity: French Polynesia
- Administrative subdivision: Tuamotus
- Commune: Makemo

Demographics
- Population: 6 (2017)

Tuanake or Mata-rua-puna is a small atoll located in the Tuamotu Archipelago in French Polynesia. It made up the Raevski Islands subgroup with Tepoto Sud and Hiti. It is administratively attached to the municipality of Makemo.

== Geography ==
Tuanake is located 7.5 kilometres (4.7 miles) west of Hiti, the nearest island, and 545 km east of Tahiti. It is a small semi-circular atoll 9.5 kilometres (5.9 miles) in length and 6.5 kilometres (4.0 miles) in maximum width for an emerged area of 6 square kilometres (2.3 square miles). Its 26 square kilometres (10 square miles) lagoon is accessible by a very shallow pass located to the south.

Tuanake has long been permanently uninhabited, but the 2017 census counts six inhabitants.

== History ==
The first recorded European to sight Tuanake was Russian explorer Fabian Gottlieb von Bellingshausen on July 15, 1820, who named it "Raevski Island". During his expedition, the American navigator Charles Wilkes approached him on December 20, 1840, notified the name of "Tunaki" and named him Reid Island.

In the nineteenth century, Tuanake became a French territory then populated by a few indigenous inhabitants who obey the chief of Katiu just like the Tepoto Sud and Hiti atolls.

== Administration ==
Tuanake belongs to the commune of Makemo, which consists of the atolls of Makemo, Haraiki, Marutea Nord, Katiu, Tuanake, Hiti, Tepoto Sud, Raroia, Takume, Taenga and Nihiru. Tuanake Atoll is permanently uninhabited.

== Economy ==
Traditional fishing is practiced with the use of two fish parks located on hoas in the south of the atoll. In recent years, Tuanake has been exploited by the inhabitants of Katiu for sea cucumber fishing for export to Asia.

== Flora and fauna ==
The presence of individuals of the species Acrocephalus atyphus and Gallicolumba erythroptera, an extremely threatened species with only about one hundred individuals recorded in the Pacific, has been reported in Tuanake as well as an endemic population of Tuamotu sandpipers.
