= Îles Leygues =

Archipelago in the Kerguelen Islands

Îles Leygues Îles Swain
- Location within Kerguelen

Geography
- Location: North of Île Howe
- Coordinates: 48°41′S 69°29′E
- Archipelago: Kerguelen
- Major islands: Île de Castries, Île Dauphine
- Area: 24 km^{2} (9.3 sq mi)
- Length: 6 km (3.7 mi)
- Width: 4 km (2.5 mi)
- Highest elevation: 71 m (233 ft)
- Highest point: Île Dauphine Highest point

Administration
- France
- Zone: French Southern and Antarctic Lands

Demographics
- Population: Uninhabited

Leygues Islands (French: Îles Leygues, occasionally called Îles Swain), are a group of small islands and islets that are part of the subantarctic Kerguelen archipelago, a French territory in the southern Indian Ocean.

They were named after Georges Leygues (1857-1933), a French politician and Minister of Marine. They are important as a breeding site for seabirds and fur seals.

== Geography ==
Leygues Islands lie across the Passe de la Résolution from Île Howe, and north of the main Kerguelen island of Grande Terre. The two largest islands are Île de Castries and Île Dauphine. Île de Castries, the largest of them, is 500 hectares (1,200 acres). Far to the north lie the Roches du Terror and to the east the Roches du Gallieni rocks. The landscape of the islands is mainly flat, though rising westwards to form coastal cliffs. Access from the sea is virtually impossible because of extensive banks of giant kelp surrounding the group.

== Ecology ==
Humans have never set foot on the islands. A large colony of Antarctic fur seals occurs which has probably never been hunted and which has enabled the recolonisation of other sites from which the species was formerly exterminated.

=== Important Bird Area ===
The islands have been identified as a 24 km^{2} Important Bird Area (IBA) by BirdLife International. Five or six pairs of wandering albatrosses breed there as well as unknown numbers of northern giant petrels and Kerguelen shags. Other petrels may also nest on the islands, but data are lacking because the only available information is from offshore observations.

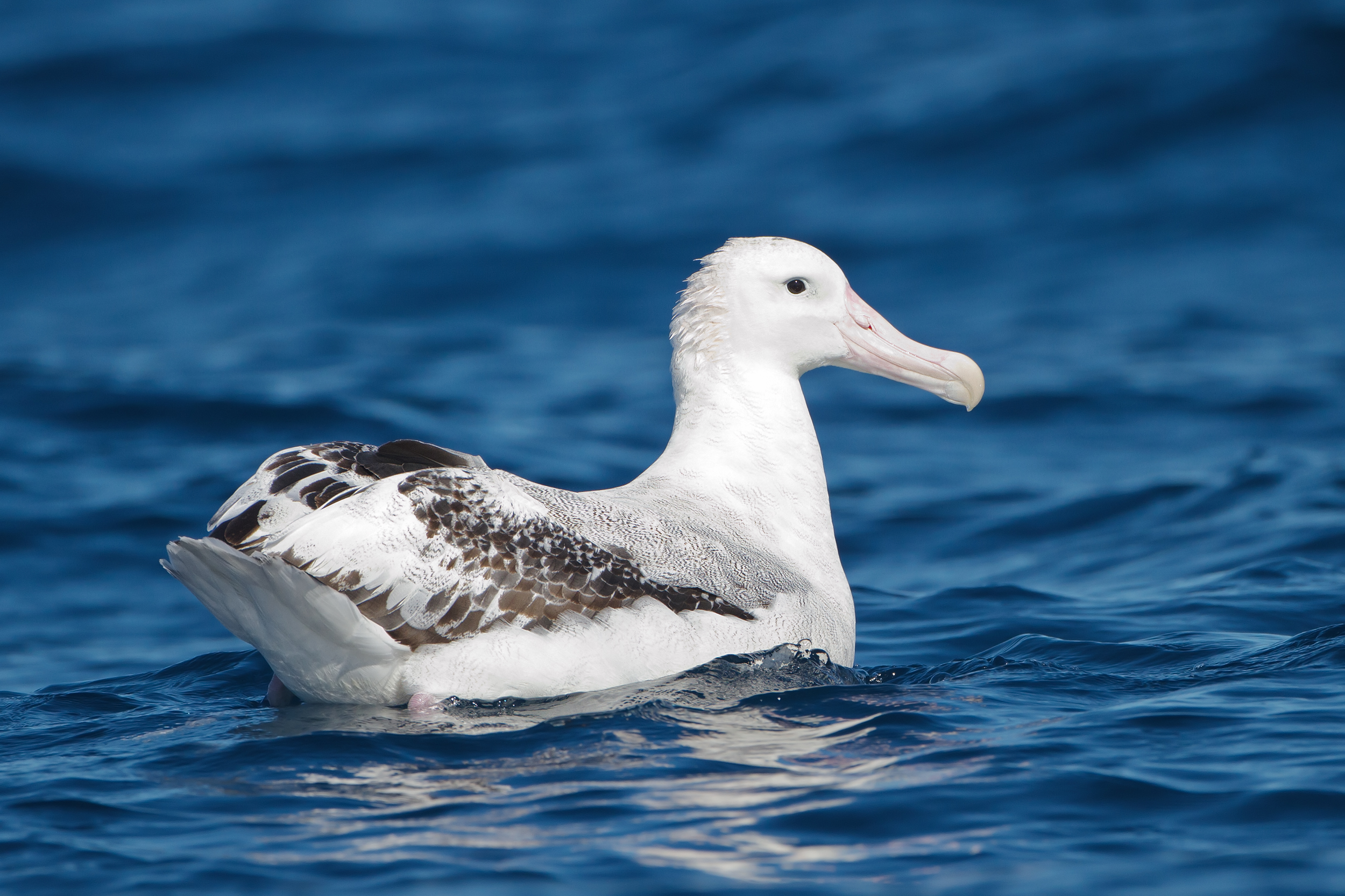
Wandering albatrosses nest on the islands in small numbers

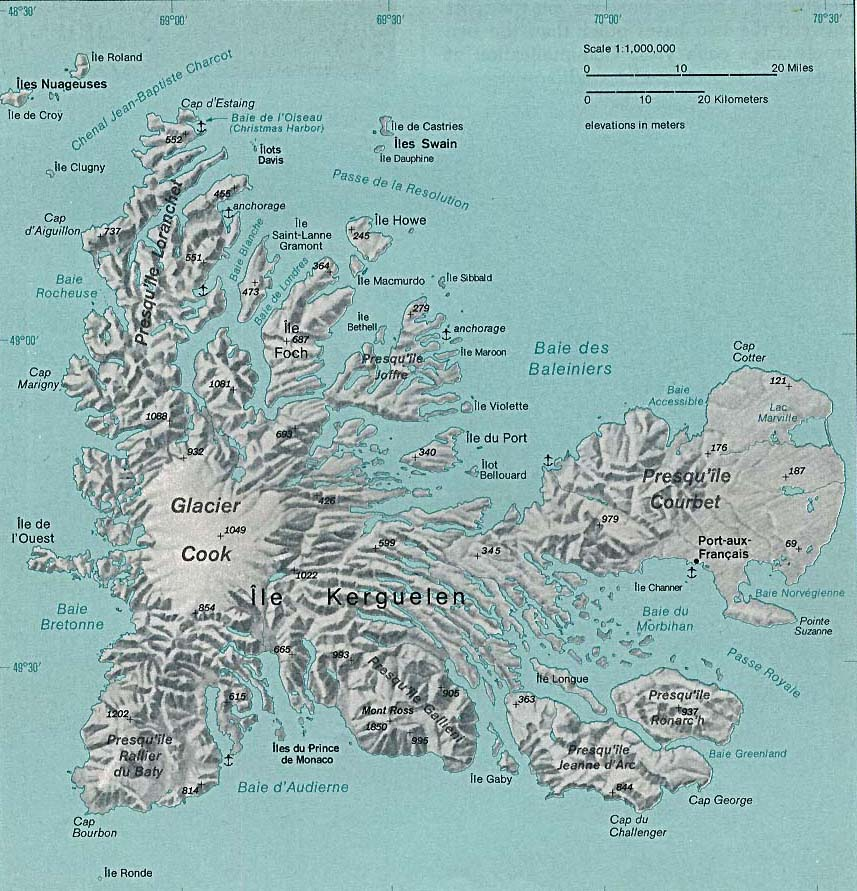
Map of Kerguelen with the Leygues Islands as Îles Swain
