= Makemo =

Atoll in French Polynesia

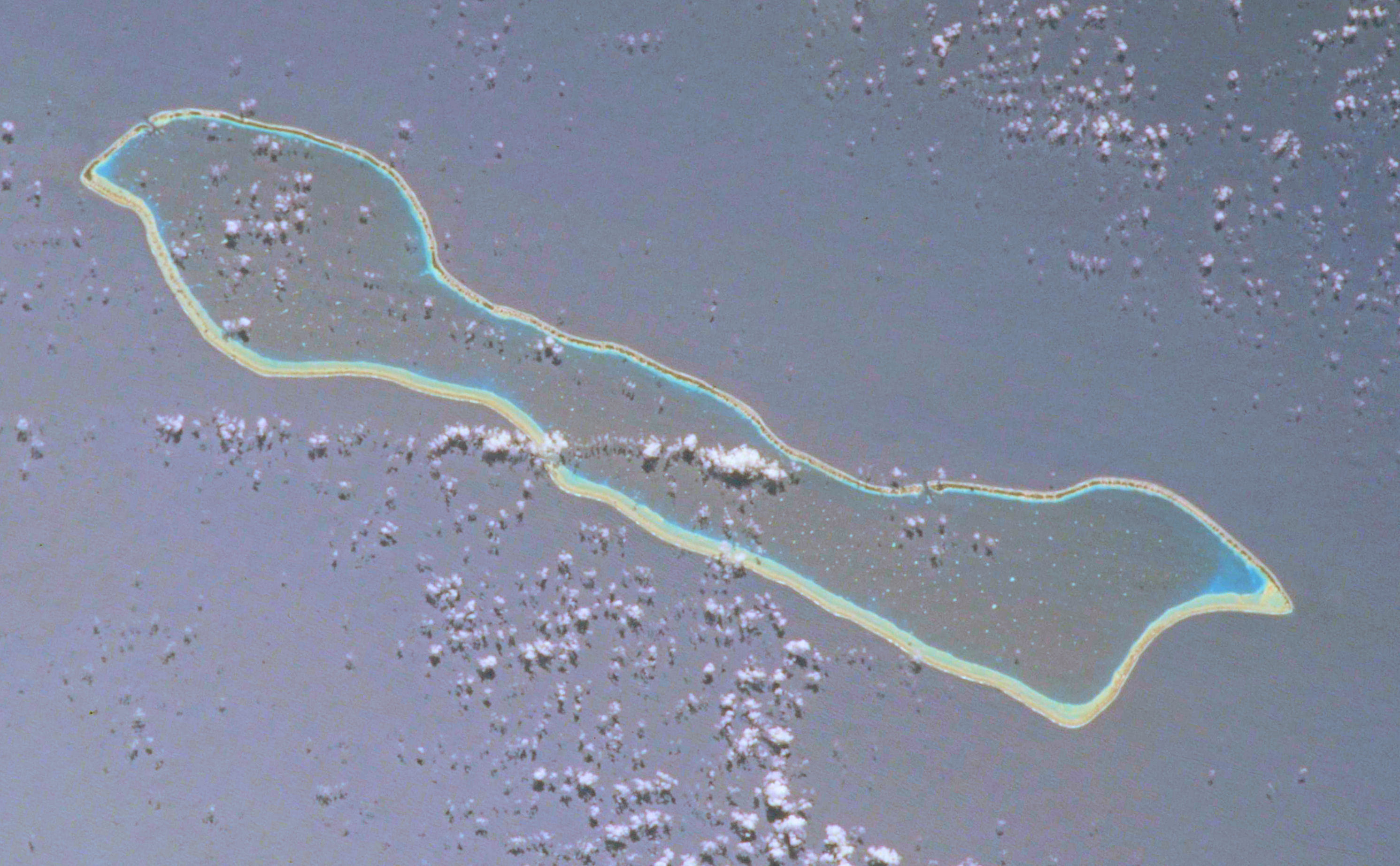
- NASA picture of Makemo Atoll

- Location within French Polynesia

Geography
- Location: Pacific Ocean
- Coordinates: 16°35′55″S 143°39′41″W
- Archipelago: Tuamotus
- Area: 603 km^{2} (233 sq mi) (lagoon); 56 km^{2} (22 sq mi) (above water)
- Length: 69 km (42.9 mi)
- Width: 16.5 km (10.25 mi)

Administration
- France
- Overseas collectivity: French Polynesia
- Administrative subdivision: Îles Tuamotu-Gambier
- Commune: Makemo
- Largest settlement: Pouheva (pop. 600)

Demographics
- Population: 816 (2022)

Makemo
- Commune
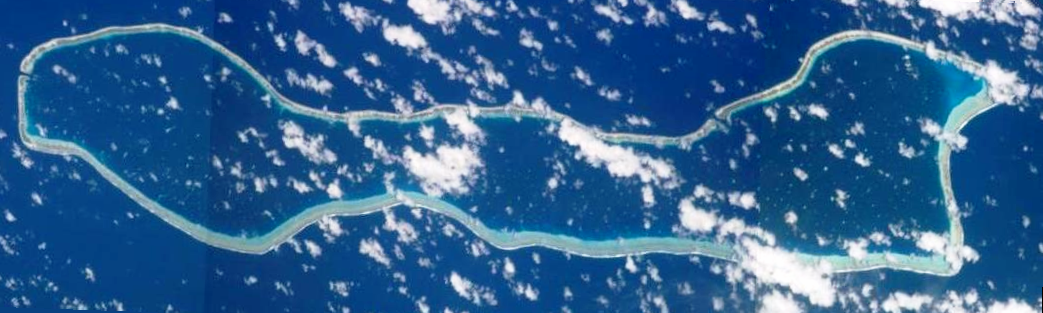
- NASA picture of Makemo Atoll.

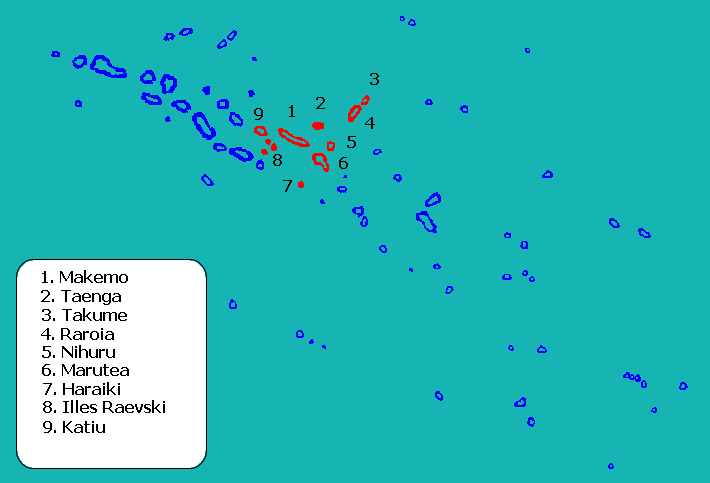
- Location of Makemo
- Coordinates: 16°35′55″S 143°39′41″W
- Country: France
- Overseas collectivity: French Polynesia
- Subdivision: Îles Tuamotu-Gambier
- Area^{1}: 100 km^{2} (39 sq mi)
- Population (2022): 1,391
  - Density: 14/km^{2} (36/sq mi)
- Time zone: UTC-10:00
- INSEE/Postal code: 98726 /98769
- ^{1} French Land Register data, which excludes lakes, ponds, glaciers > 1 km^{2} (0.386 sq mi or 247 acres) and river estuaries.

Makemo, Rangi-kemo or Te Paritua, is an inhabited atoll in the Tuamotu archipelago in French Polynesia.

== History ==
Makemo is the home of legendary Polynesian hero Moeava. The first recorded European to arrive to Makemo Atoll was English pearl merchant John Buyers on the brig Margaret. He arrived at Makemo on 10 March 1803 on the same day he discovered Taenga and named the Makemo Atoll "Phillips Island", after a late sheriff of London, Sir Richard Phillips. In some maps Makemo appears as "Kutusov".

In the 19th century, Makemo became a French territory with a population of about 250 indigenous inhabitants around 1850, making it one of the largest in the Tuamotus; it was used as a port for ships. By mid-century, the atoll was evangelized with the founding of St. Joseph Parish in 1851 (which since 2004 also includes churches on Taenga and Nihiru Atolls), followed by the construction of the church of the same name in 1975, attached to the Diocese of Papetee.

=== Legend ===
The legend explains that the famous warrior fell in love with Huarei, queen of the island Tepukamaruia. The giant Patira became jealous and the two Warriors challenged each other to combat on the island of Makemo. Moeava arrived first and prepared a giant slingshot. When his rival appeared, he chose a large, round, smooth stone, made a prayer to the god Tu, and killed Patira with a shot to the head. Today, a huge round, smooth stone can be seen in the Makemo lagoon. It is the Moeava stone.

=== Pacific Experimentation Center ===
Between 1960 and 2000, a French armed forces research center, euphemistically called Centre d'expérimentation du Pacifique, was located on the island. It participated in the testing of French Nuclear weapons. For this purpose, a military infrastructure was built on the main island, including an airport. This infrastructure will be gradually dismantled. This process began in 2009. Since the research center was a major employer, other forms of employment were created on the island for the population, such as fish farming and tourism. Investments are also being made in the use of solar panels and a desalination plant.

== Geography ==
The atoll is 70 km long and about 10 km wide on average. The total area is 56 km^{2}. The lagoon is the third largest of the Tuamotu with 603 km^{2}, and has two navigable passages. The main village is Pouheua, and the total population is 588 inhabitants in the 1996 census. It has a Catholic church, an elementary school and an airport. The main activity is Pearl farming.

=== Climate ===
The climate is tropical, typical of this southern region. The average temperature is 24 °C. The warmest month is March, at 26 °C, and the coldest month is October, at 21 °C.10 Average rainfall is 1,707 millimeters per year. The rainiest month is December, with 326 millimeters of rain, and the driest month, August, with 36 millimeters.

== Administration ==
The commune of Makemo consists of the atolls of Makemo, Haraiki, Marutea Nord, Katiu, Tuanake, Hiti, Tepoto Sud, Raroia, Takume, Taenga and Nihiru.

== Demography ==
In 2022, the total population of Makemo was 816 persons grouped mainly in the village of Pouheva; its evolution is as follows:

1983	1988	1996	2002	2007	2012	2017
360	373	588	720	728	832	825
Sources: Statistical Institute of French Polynesia. and Government of French Polynesia.

Pouheva, located near the Arikitamiro Pass (passe d'Arikitamiro), is the main village of the atoll. It has about 600 inhabitants.

=== Religion ===
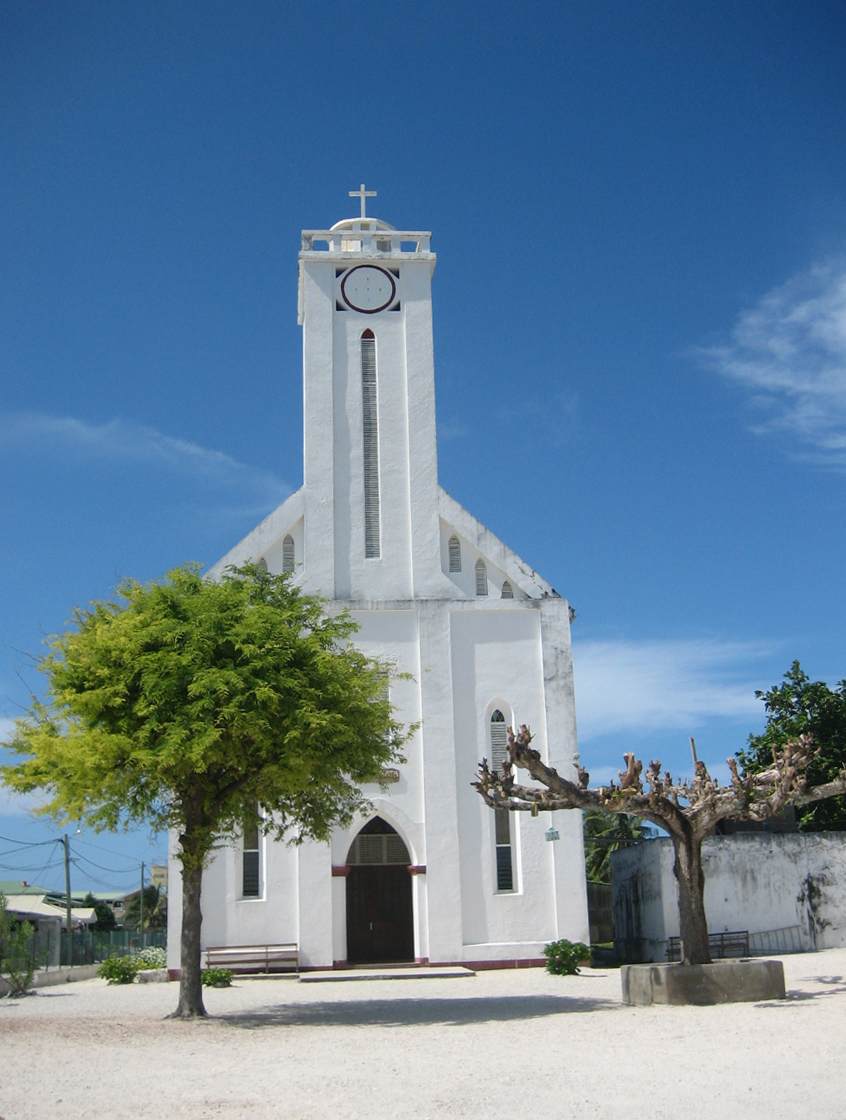
St. Joseph's Church in Makemo

Most of the population of the Atoll is affiliated with Christianity, as a result of the activity of both Catholic and Protestant missionary groups. The Catholic Church has a main religious building in the area called St. Joseph's Church (Église de Saint-Joseph) which ecclesiastically depends on the Metropolitan Archdiocese of Papeete based on the island of Tahiti.

== Economy ==
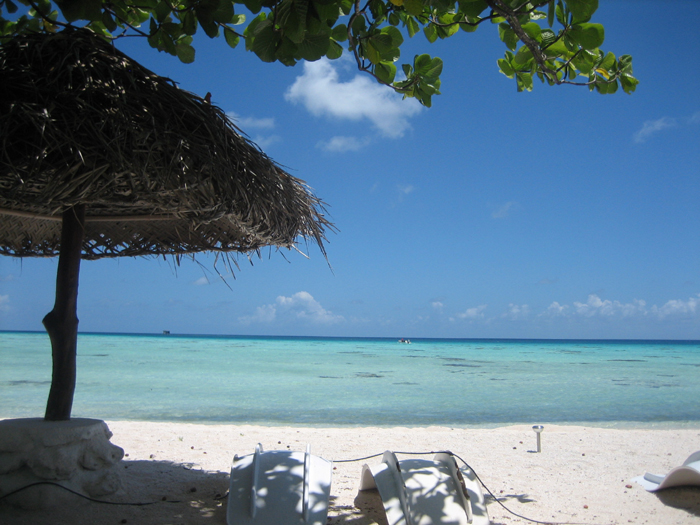
Beach on Makemo

Tourism, especially with the development of diving near the two passes, is the main economic sector of the island, along with pearl farming (authorized on only 50 ha of the lagoon), sea cucumber harvesting (in the southern part, below the line linking motu Tahiti Toreu to motu Piupiu) and copra farming. The administrative activities of the commune, which includes eleven surrounding atolls, also develop and provide work. The landing of the Natitua submarine cable and its commissioning in December 2018 allows Makemo to be connected to Tahiti and to the global high-speed Internet.

A small domestic airfield with a 1,500-meter runway was built in 1976. It serves, on average, about 500 flights and 10,000 passengers per year, of which 30% are transit Passengers.
