= Île du Belvédère =

Coordinates: 48°52′52″N 2°22′59″E

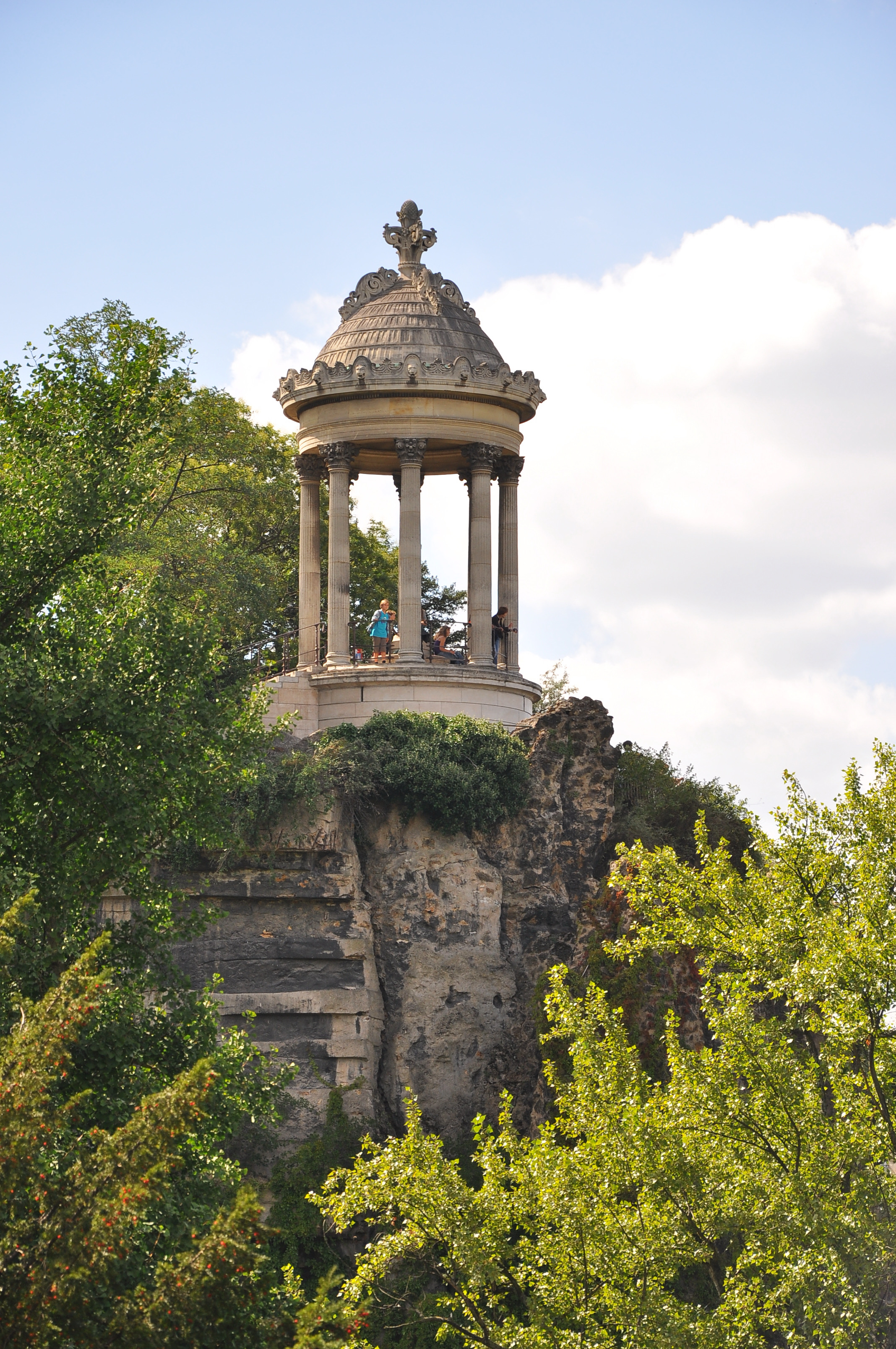
The Temple de la Sibylle

Île du Belvédère is an island located on the lake of Parc des Buttes Chaumont, in the 19th arrondissement of Paris. Covering an area of around 6,700 m^{2} (72,000 sq ft), it is connected to the bank by two bridges: to the west by Pont des Suicidés, made of stone, and to the south by a hanging walkway, made of wood.

== The Temple de la Sibylle ==
This pavilion, referred to as the "Temple of Sibyl", located at the top of the island, is at a height of 30 meters above the lake water level. It was built in 1866 by Gabriel Davioud and inspired by the Temple of Vesta in Tivoli, Italy; a similar structure, also built by Davioud, is found in the Bois de Vincennes on Île de Reuilly.
