= Katiu =

Atoll in French Polynesia

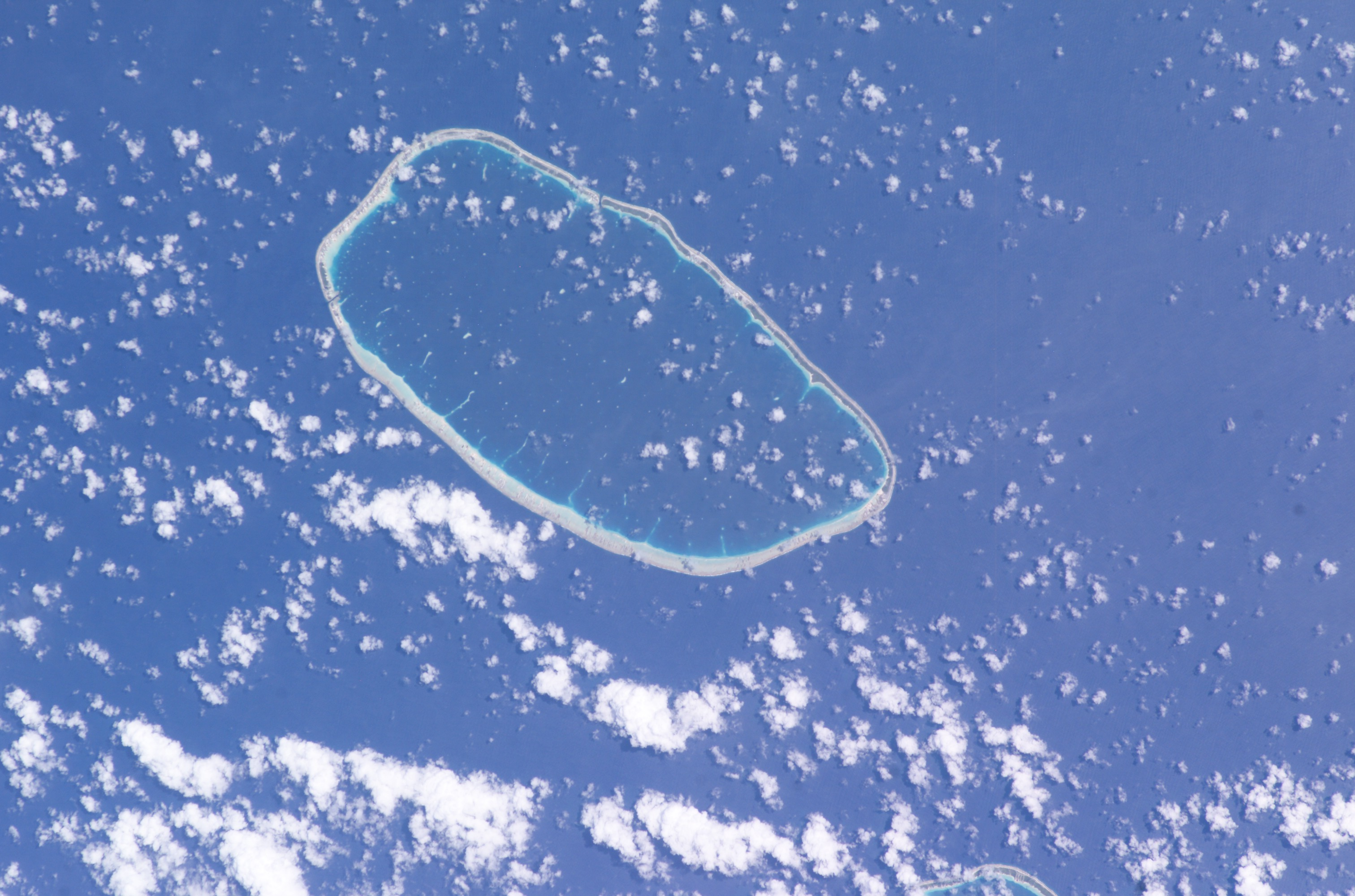
- NASA picture of Katiu Atoll

- Location within French Polynesia

Geography
- Location: Pacific Ocean
- Coordinates: 16°25′S 144°22′W
- Archipelago: Tuamotus
- Area: 232.5 km^{2} (89.8 sq mi) (lagoon); 10 km^{2} (4 sq mi) (above water)
- Length: 27 km (16.8 mi)
- Width: 12.5 km (7.77 mi)

Administration
- France
- Overseas collectivity: French Polynesia
- Administrative subdivision: Tuamotus
- Commune: Makemo
- Largest settlement: Toini

Demographics
- Population: 257 (2022)

Katiu, or Taungataki, is an atoll of the central Tuamotu Archipelago in French Polynesia. It is located 23.5 kilometres (14.6 miles) west of Makemo Atoll's westernmost point. It measures 27 kilometres (17 miles) in length with a maximum width of 12.5 kilometres (7.8 miles). Its total area, including the lagoon is 232.5 square kilometres (89.8 square miles) and a land area of approximately 10 square kilometres (4 square miles). There are many narrow islands on the north-eastern side of its long reef with a total land area of about 3 square kilometres (1 square mile). Its lagoon is connected to the ocean.

Katiu has a population of 250 inhabitants. The main occupations are fishing, copra harvesting and pearl farming. The most important village is called Toini; it is located on one of the long islands of the northeastern reef.

== History ==
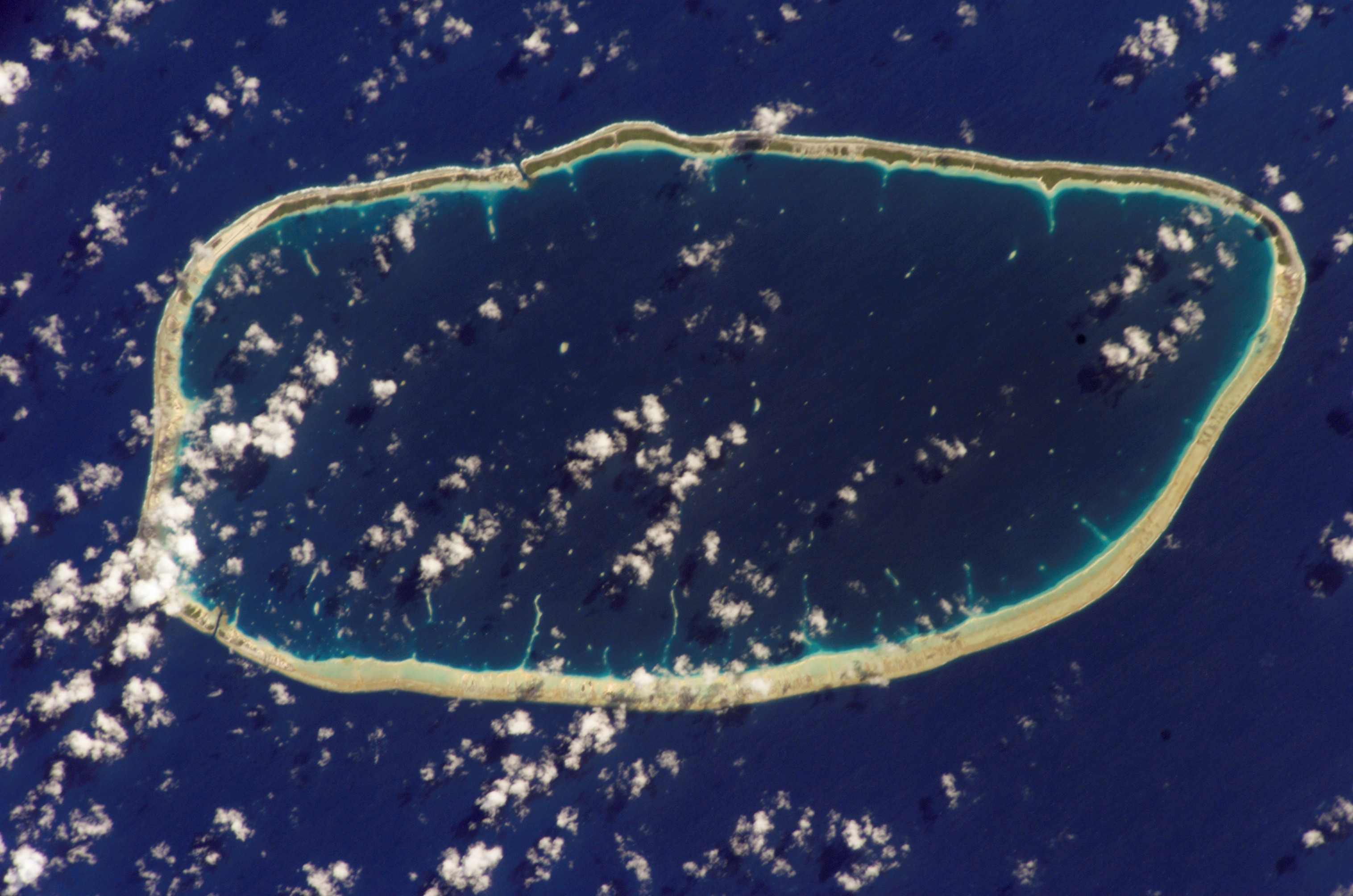
NASA picture of Katiu Atoll.

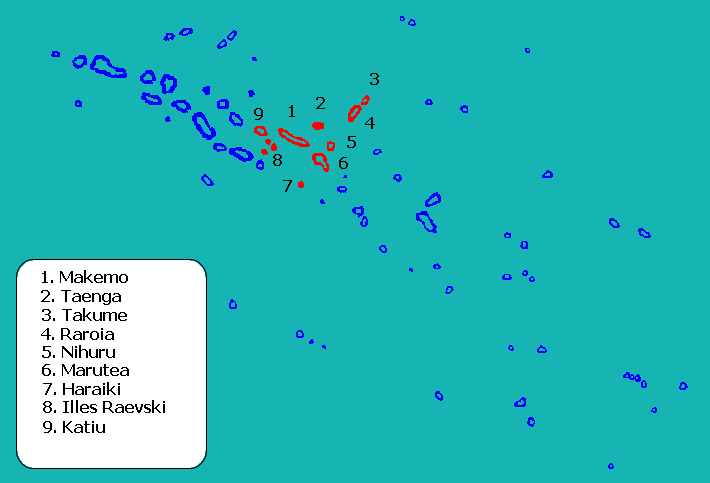
Location within Makemo Commune

The first recorded European to arrive to Katiu was Russian oceanic explorer Fabian Gottlieb von Bellingshausen in 1820 on the ships Vostok and Mirni. He named this atoll "Osten-Saken" or "Saken".

== Administration ==
Katiu belongs to the commune of Makemo, which consists of the atolls of Makemo, Haraiki, Marutea Nord, Katiu, Tuanake, Hiti, Tepoto Sud, Raroia, Takume, Taenga and Nihiru.
