= Haraiki =

Atoll in French Polynesia

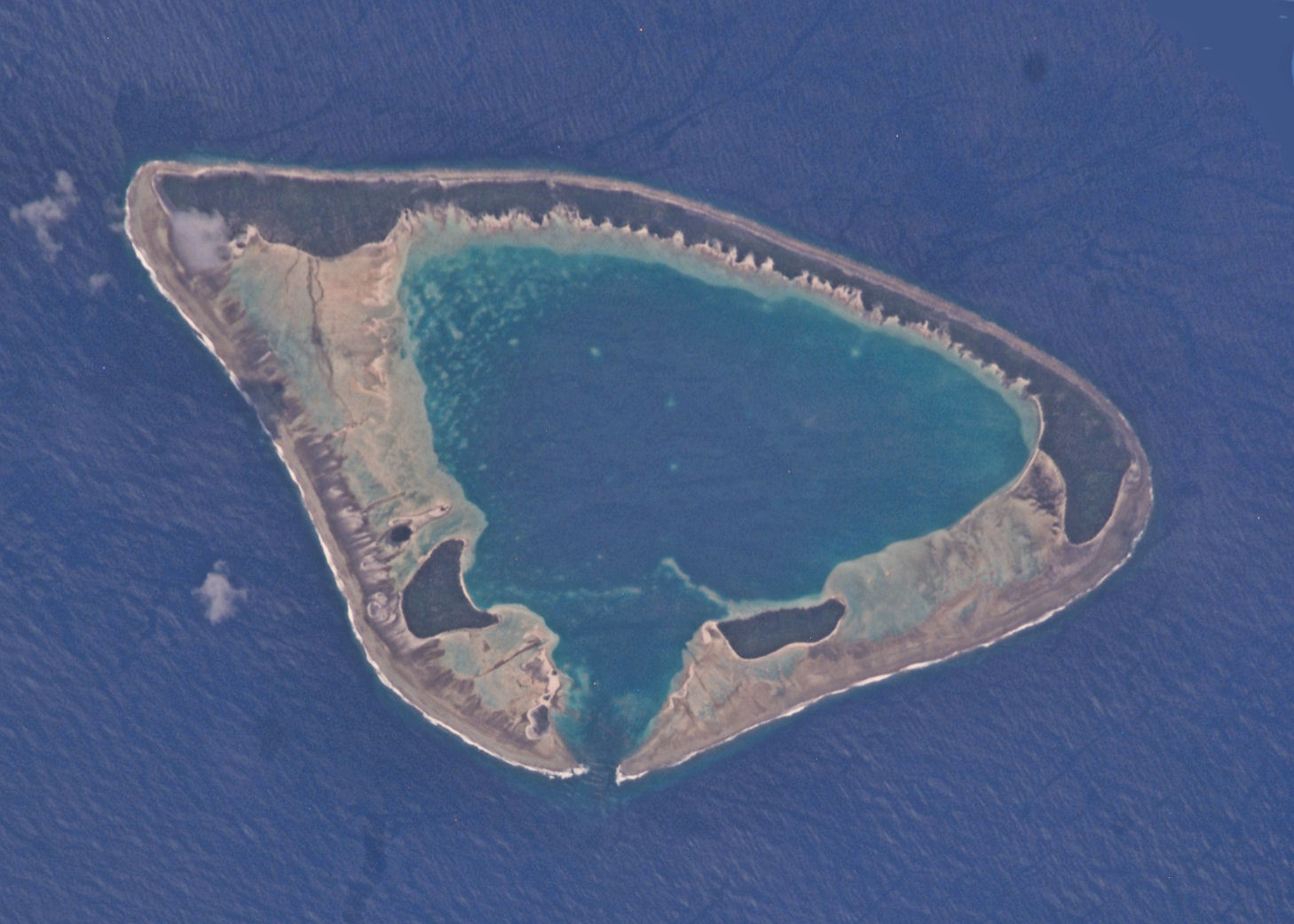
- NASA picture of Haraiki Atoll

- Location within French Polynesia

Geography
- Location: Pacific Ocean
- Coordinates: 17°28′S 143°28′W
- Archipelago: Tuamotus
- Area: 10.4 km^{2} (4.0 sq mi) (lagoon); 4 km^{2} (1.5 sq mi) (above water)
- Length: 7 km (4.3 mi)
- Width: 5 km (3.1 mi)

Administration
- France
- Overseas collectivity: French Polynesia
- Administrative subdivision: Tuamotus
- Commune: Makemo

Demographics
- Population: Uninhabited (2012)

Haraiki is a small atoll of the Tuamotu Archipelago in French Polynesia. It is located 42 km southwest of Marutea Nord.

Haraiki Atoll is roughly triangular in shape. It measures 7 km in length with a maximum width of 5 km. There are three islets on its reef with a total land area of about 4 km^{2}. Its lagoon has a pass facing south.

Haraiki is purportedly uninhabited. However, Google Maps reveals there is a small collection of buildings on the north shore (-17.446343,-143.455739) and that the bulk of the land on all three islets has been heavily planted with a grid-like patchwork of trees or large shrubs.

== History ==
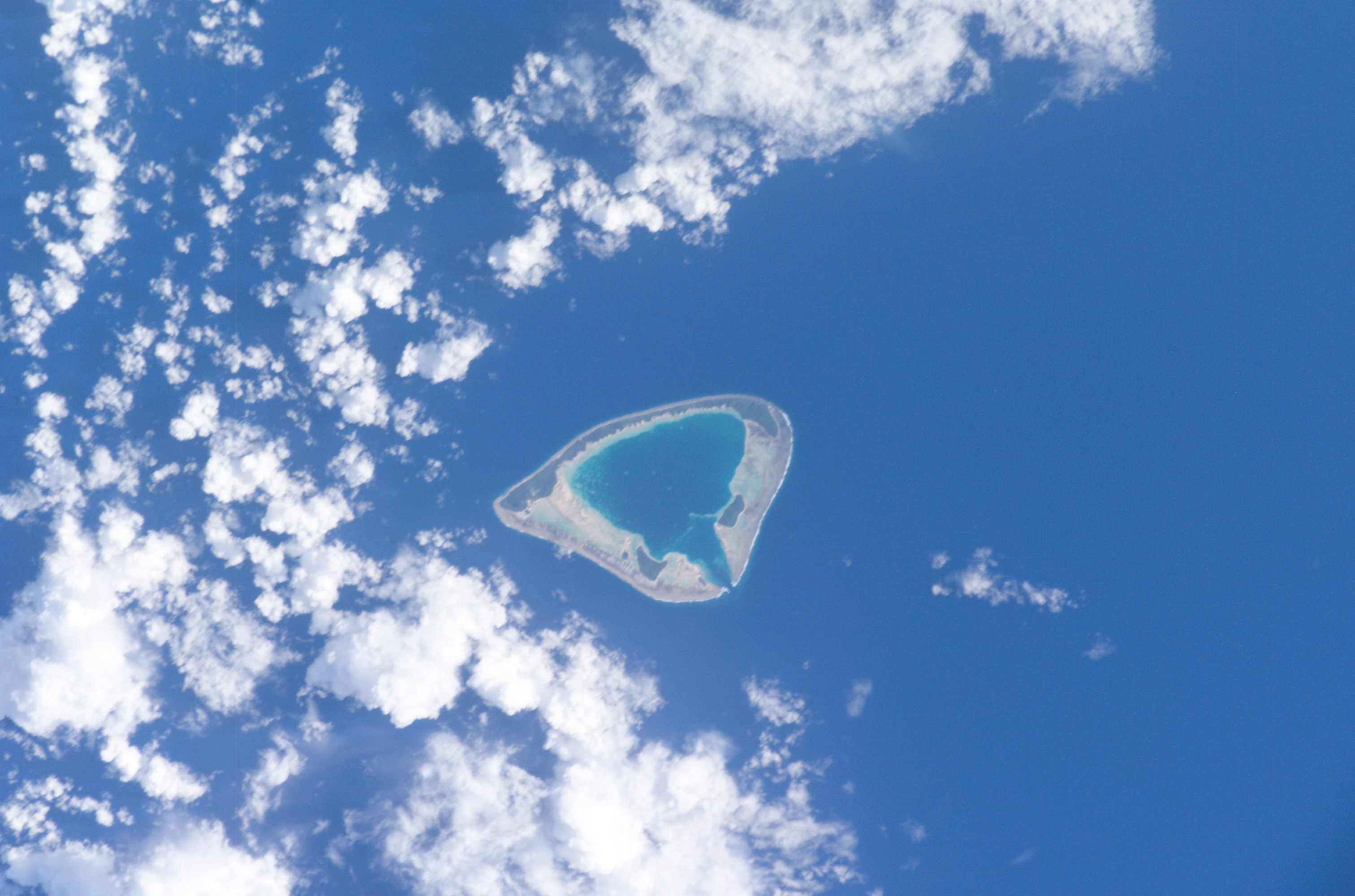
Another NASA picture of Haraiki Atoll

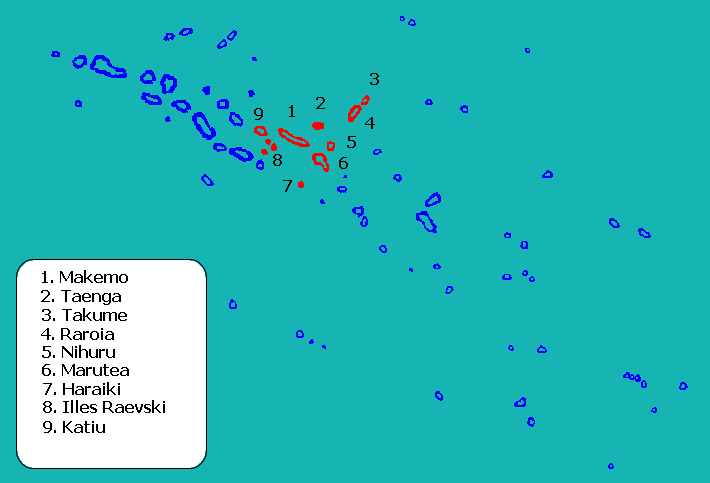
Location within Makemo Commune

The first recorded European to sight Haraiki Atoll was Spanish navigator Domingo de Boenechea on October 31, 1772, on ship Aguila. He named this atoll "San Quintín".

== Administration ==
Haraiki belongs to the commune of Makemo, which consists of the atolls of Makemo, Haraiki, Marutea Nord, Katiu, Tuanake, Hiti, Tepoto Sud, Raroia, Takume, Taenga and Nihiru.
