= Taenga =

Atoll in French Polynesia

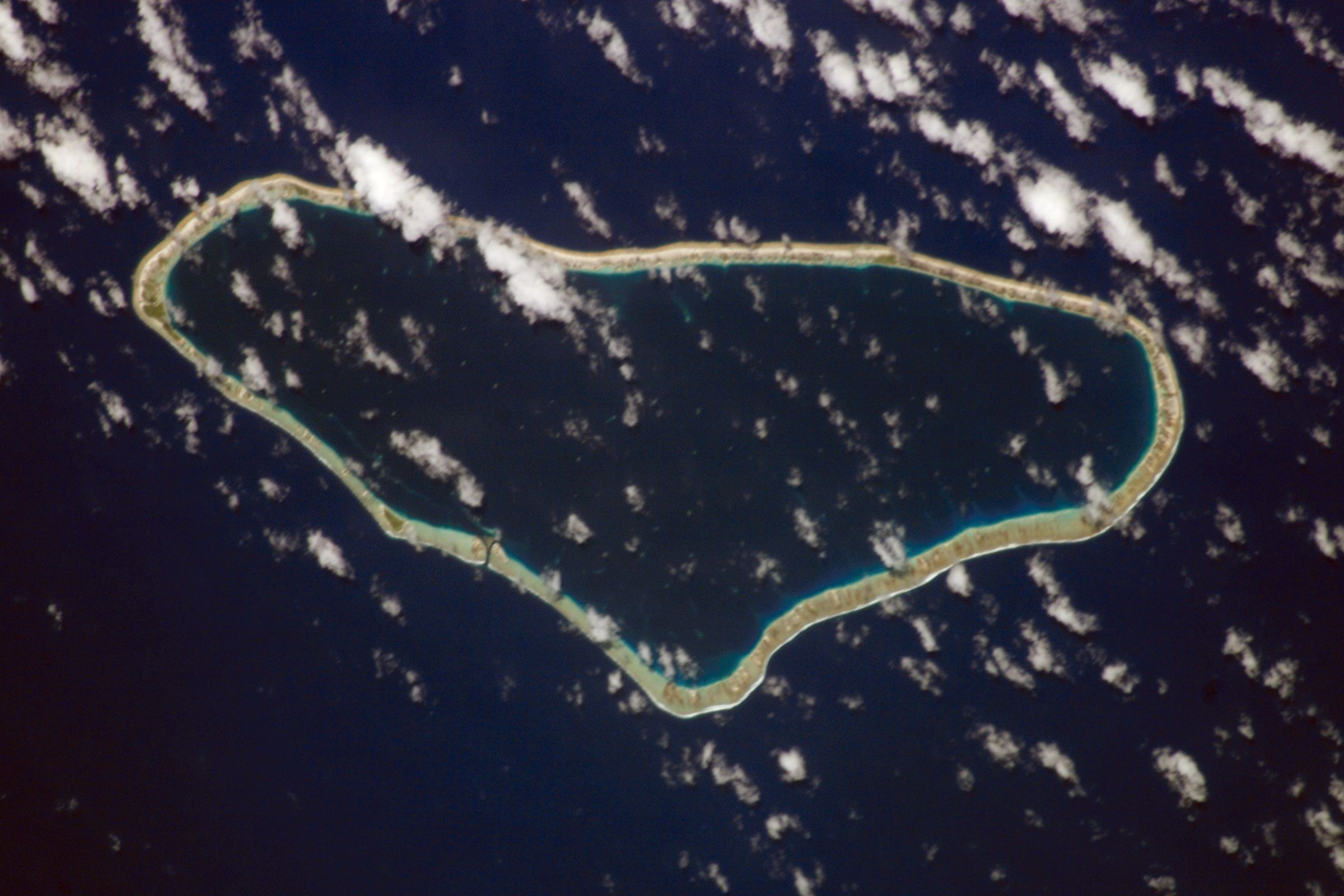
- NASA picture of Taenga Atoll

- Location within French Polynesia

Geography
- Location: Pacific Ocean
- Coordinates: 16°21′S 143°07′W
- Archipelago: Tuamotus
- Area: 140 km^{2} (54 sq mi) (lagoon); 20 km^{2} (8 sq mi) (above water)
- Length: 27 km (16.8 mi)
- Width: 11 km (6.8 mi)

Administration
- France
- Overseas collectivity: French Polynesia
- Administrative subdivision: Tuamotus
- Commune: Makemo

Demographics
- Population: 65 (2022)

Taenga, or Taunga-hara, is one of the Tuamotu atolls in French Polynesia. It is located 32 km to the northeast of Makemo Atoll and 27 km to the northwest of Nihiru Atoll.

Taenga Atoll is roughly triangular in shape. It measures 27 km in length with a maximum width of 11 km.

Taenga's lagoon has an area of 120 square kilometres (46 square miles). It is very difficult to enter on account of the currents and the very narrow pass.

This atoll has 65 inhabitants (2022), most of whom are Mormons who have lived there since 1845.

== History ==
Taenga Atoll was first discovered by John Buyers on 10 March 1803 who named it "Holts Island" on the same day as he discovered Makemo atoll. It was later rediscovered by Russian explorer Fabian Gottlieb von Bellingshausen in 1820. In some maps it still appears as "Yermolov".

== Administration ==
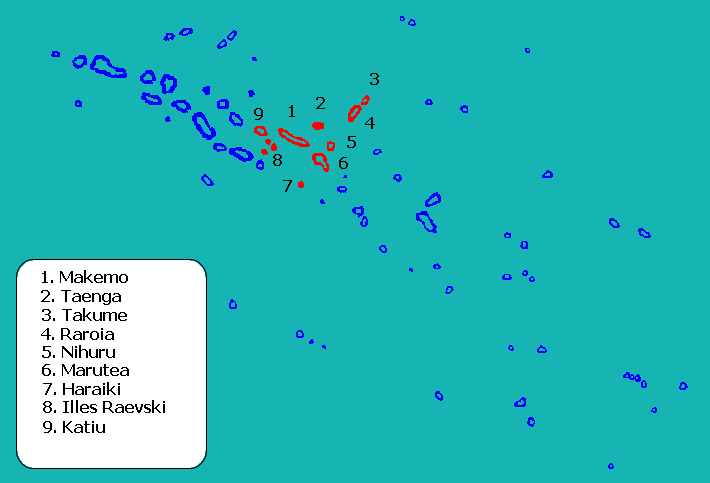
Location within Makemo Commune

Taenga Atoll belongs to the commune of Makemo, which consists of the atolls of Makemo, Haraiki, Marutea Nord, Katiu, Tuanake, Hiti, Tepoto Sud, Raroia, Takume, Taenga and Nihiru.
