= Tepoto (South) =

Atoll in French Polynesia

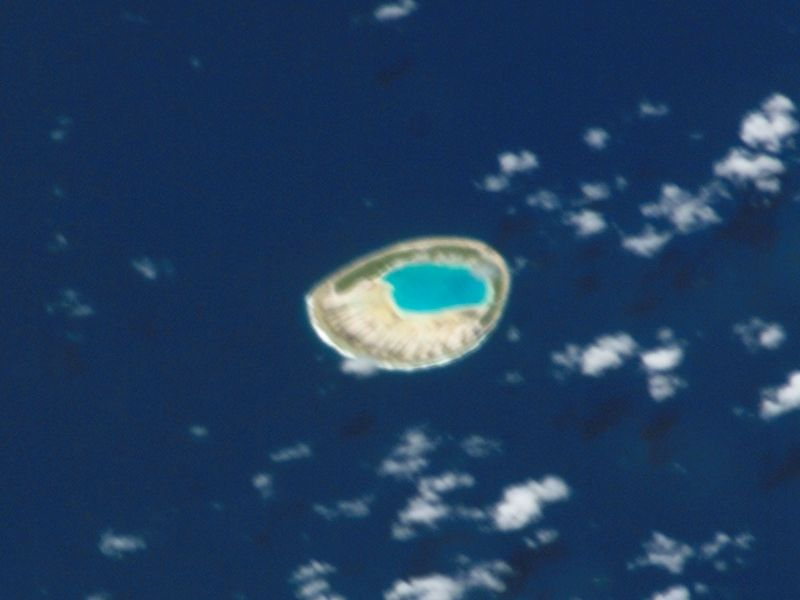
- NASA picture of Tepoto Atoll

- Location within French Polynesia

Geography
- Location: Pacific Ocean
- Coordinates: 16°48′S 144°16′W
- Archipelago: Tuamotus
- Area: 2.5 km^{2} (0.97 sq mi) (lagoon); 0.6 square kilometres (0.2 square miles) (above water)
- Length: 3.8 km (2.36 mi)
- Width: 3.8 km (2.36 mi)

Administration
- France
- Overseas collectivity: French Polynesia
- Administrative subdivision: Tuamotus
- Commune: Makemo

Demographics
- Population: Uninhabited (2012)

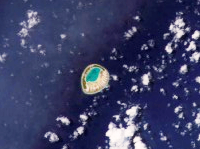
Another NASA picture of Tepoto Atoll

Tepoto Atoll (Tepoto Sud), or Ti Poto, is a small atoll of the Tuamotu Archipelago in French Polynesia. It is located 44 kilometres (27 miles) southwest of Makemo Atoll.

Tepoto Atoll is almost round in shape. It measures 3.8 kilometres (2 miles) in diameter. Its lovely turquoise-blue lagoon is connected to the ocean by a narrow channel in the north-east.

This atoll is sometimes called Tepoto Sud in French, to distinguish it from the island of Tepoto, approximately 400 kilometres (249 miles) to the northeast in the Disappointment Islands.

The small group formed by Tepoto Sud, Hiti and Tuanake is also known as the "Raevski Atolls". The Tuamotu reed warbler and the Polynesian ground dove are found in this area.

Tepoto Atoll is permanently uninhabited.

According to articles in Ireland's Own and the Times Educational Supplement Website, the atoll is identified by Tony Crowley as being the site of buried treasure stolen during the 19th century by four adventurers from a church in Pisco, Peru. Over the years, people have searched for the treasure without success, though an Australian visitor to the atoll discovered a cache of medallions, the contents of which indicated they came from South America.

== History ==
Tepoto Sud was sighted by French explorer Louis-Antoine de Bougainville in 1768, but the first European to land was Russian explorer Fabian Gottlieb von Bellingshausen in 1820.

== Administration ==
Tepoto Sud belongs to the commune of Makemo, which consists of the atolls of Makemo, Haraiki, Marutea Nord, Katiu, Tuanake, Hiti, Tepoto Sud, Raroia, Takume, Taenga and Nihiru.
