= Hiti =

Atoll in French Polynesia

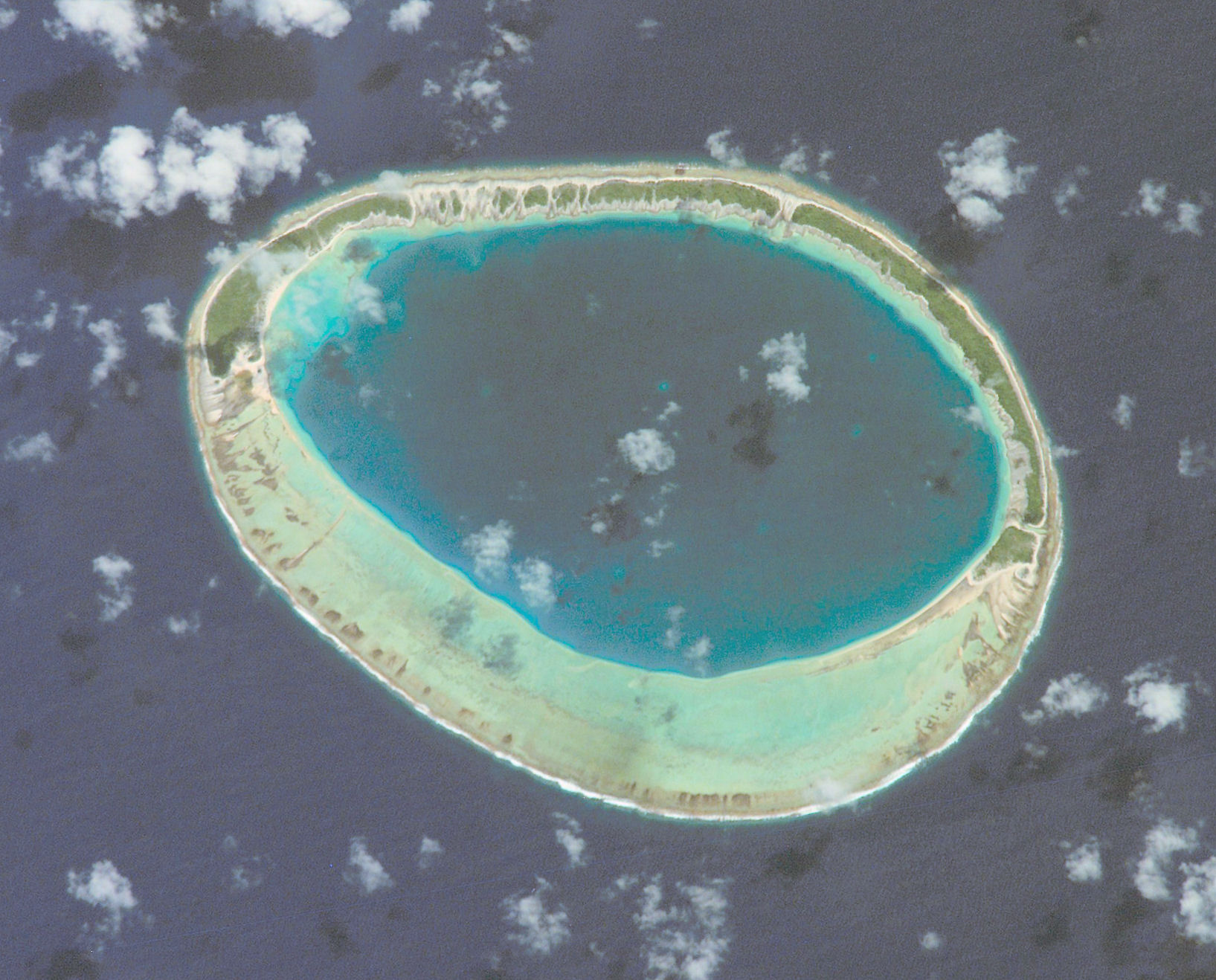
- NASA picture of Hiti Atoll

- Location within French Polynesia

Geography
- Location: Pacific Ocean
- Coordinates: 16°40′S 144°07′W
- Archipelago: Tuamotus
- Area: 15 km^{2} (5.8 sq mi) (lagoon); 3 km^{2} (above water)
- Length: 9 km (5.6 mi)
- Width: 6 km (3.7 mi)

Administration
- France
- Overseas collectivity: French Polynesia
- Administrative subdivision: Tuamotus
- Commune: Makemo

Demographics
- Population: Uninhabited (2012)

Hiti, or Hiti-rau-mea, is a small atoll of the Tuamotu Archipelago in French Polynesia. It is located 19 km southwest of Makemo Atoll.

Hiti Atoll is oval in shape. It measures 9 km in length with a maximum width of 6 km. There are some narrow islands on the northern side of its reef with a total land area of about 3 km^{2}. The southern part of the reef is broader but has no islands. Hiti's lagoon is not connected to the ocean by a pass.

The small group formed by Hiti, Tepoto Sud and Tuanake is also known as the "Raevski Atolls". The Tuamotu reed warbler and the Polynesian ground dove are found in this area.

Hiti Atoll is permanently uninhabited.

== History ==
The first recorded European to arrive to Hiti Atoll was Russian oceanic explorer Fabian Gottlieb von Bellingshausen in 1820.

== Administration ==
Hiti belongs to the commune of Makemo, which consists of the atolls of Makemo, Haraiki, Marutea Nord, Katiu, Tuanake, Hiti, Tepoto Sud, Raroia, Takume, Taenga and Nihiru.

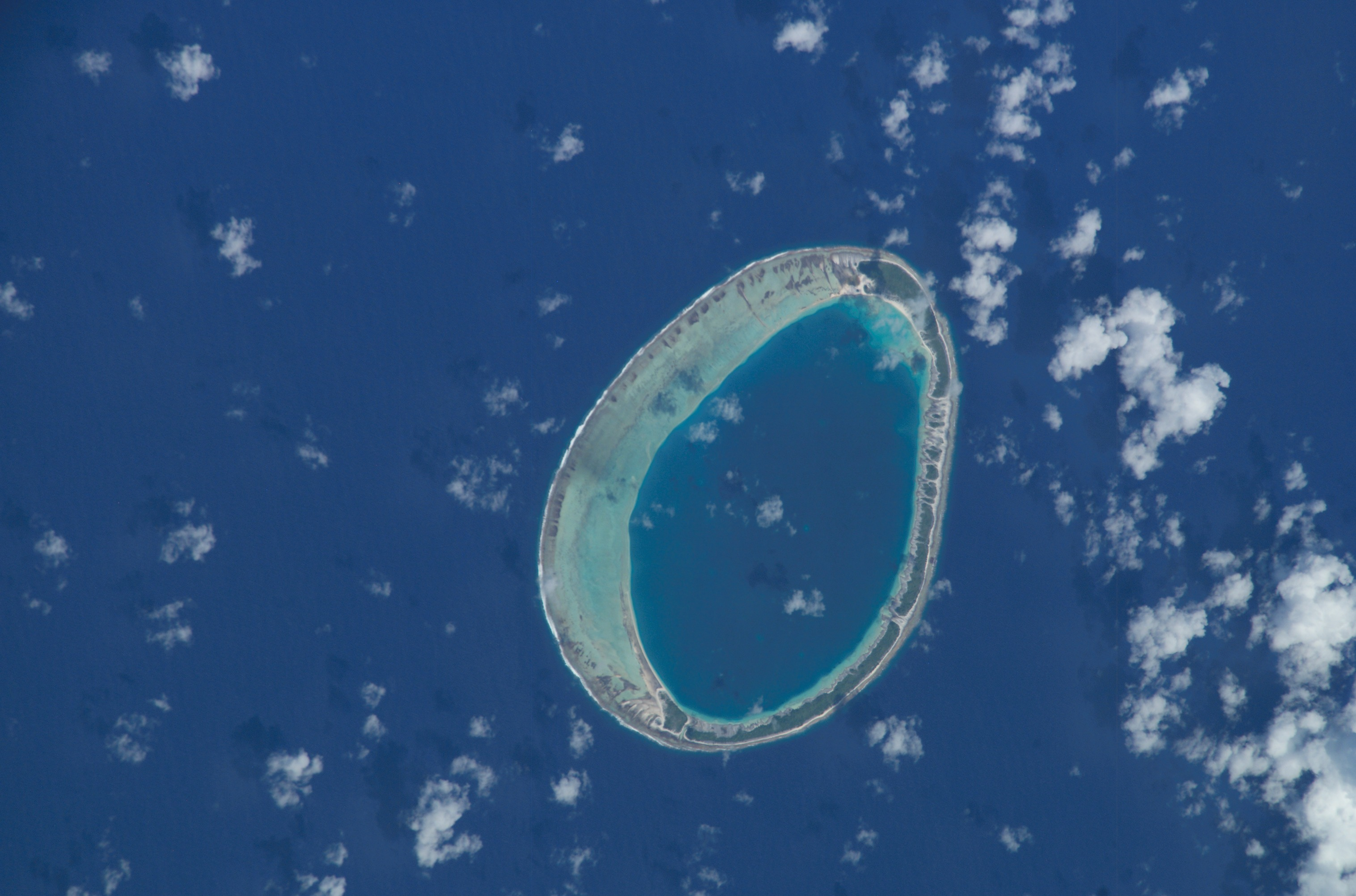
Another NASA picture of Hiti Atoll

== See also ==
- Desert island
- List of islands
