= Fosh =

Fosh or FOSH may refer to:

- The Fosh (Star Wars), a fictional race in the Star Wars universe
- Fosh (Haganah unit), an elite Jewish strike force
- Fosh (baseball), a type of baseball pitch
- Free and open source hardware

== People ==
- Marc Fosh (born 1963), British chef
- Matthew Fosh (born 1957), British cricketer
- Max Fosh (born 1995), British YouTuber

== See also ==
- Foch (disambiguation)
- Foix, pronounced "Fosh" in Catalan, a commune in southern France
