= Foch (disambiguation) =

Foch most often refers to Ferdinand Foch (1851–1929), Marshal of France and Allied Supreme Commander in World War I.

It may also refer to:

== Military ==
- French cruiser Foch, a French Navy ship sunk in 1942
- French aircraft carrier Foch, a French Navy ship sold to Brazil in 2000
- AMX-50 Foch, a long-range support variant of the AMX-50 tank

== Places ==
- Foch, West Virginia, an unincorporated area in the United States
- Île Foch, an island in the Kerguelen archipelago in the Indian Ocean, owned by France
- Mount Foch, Canada, on the border between Alberta and British Columbia

== Streets ==
- Various streets and avenues - see List of streets named after Ferdinand Foch
  - Avenue Foch, the widest street in Paris
  - Foch Street, Beirut, Lebanon
  - Yan'an Road, Shanghai, China, formerly called Avenue Foch

== Other uses ==
- Nina Foch (1924–2008), Dutch-American actress
- Foch Hospital, a teaching hospital in the Suresnes, France

== See also ==
- Foch Line, a proposed line of demarcation between Poland and Lithuania after World War I
- Maréchal Foch (disambiguation)
- Foch's tuco-tuco, a rodent species
