= Jonathan Tennyson (car designer) =

American car designer (1945–1997)

- Born: John Arthur "Jack" Tennyson; April 16, 1945; Ottumwa, Iowa
- Died: April 21, 1997; Dallas, Texas
- Known for: Designing and building solar and electric cars

Jonathan Arthur Tennyson (April 16, 1945 – April 21, 1997), was an American car designer focused on alternative fuels.

== Early life ==
Jack, as he was known until 1975, was born in Ottumwa, Iowa to Arthur Tennyson, a manager at Wapello Dairies, Inc., and Opal Ross, a hairdresser. The second of three children, he was the only son. The Tennyson name is a corruption of his great-grandfather's Dutch surname, Theunissen. His mother was descended from the Dubois, Van Meter, and Henckel families.

Jack attended Drake University in Des Moines, Iowa where he was a member of Alpha Tau Omega fraternity. It was there he met his future wife, Lynda. They were married on 29 June 1968. After marriage, they relocated to Florida, where Jack worked in graphic design and marketing and where their two children were born.

== Florida ==
In the early 1970s, Jack met hairdresser, Paul Mitchell.

Jack designed and created marketing materials for Paul and his partners' company, Winston Brooks Production Company, including the "...28-inch-by-12-inch, orange-and-black ticket" to the Traveling Energy Crisis Road Show – a cross-country hair show.

Their business relationship turned into a friendship that would last until Paul's passing in 1989.

In 1975 Jack began calling himself Jonathan, bought a hundred acres west of Gainesville, FL, along the Suwannee River, and started his own commune named The Village of Orphalese, the name taken from the book The Prophet by Kahlil Gibran. Lynda and Jack/Jonathan were divorced that year.

While at The Village, Jonathan met another woman, Lisa, with whom he had two more children.

It was while living in Florida that he began experimenting with living off the land while also living off the grid. He pulled concepts from alternative teachings explored in the 1970s and incorporated them into The Village.

His home was a pyramid due to the concept of Pyramid Power. He and his family ate a macrobiotic diet, growing some of their own food. He tried to live with a respect to the Mother Earth, in reverence to his appreciation of Native American beliefs.

He was against nuclear power and attended events sponsored by The Catfish Alliance in Florida.

It was this desire to protect the planet that led him to design and build solar and electric powered cars.

== Hawaii ==
In December 1981, Jonathan relocated his family to the Big Island of Hawaii. He bought a plot of land above the cane fields, which sat above the small town of Paauilo. This new commune became known as The Farm.

Jonathan and his family lived in tents for the first year while they built their homes. Jonathan felt building small, hexagonal, single room homes for each family member was a better way to co-exist than with everyone living under the same roof. The Farm, when completed, would have one communal kitchen, a communal shower, a pond, a greenhouse, and a workshop.

Jonathan and Paul Mitchell, now both living in Hawaii, began collaborating on a solar car project that would result in the construction of the Mana La ("power of the sun" in Hawaiian), a solar car that qualified for second start position (P2) in the first World Solar Challenge, in Australia, in 1987.

== The Mana La ==
Jonathan designed and built the car on The Farm at a cost of $250,000, funded by John Paul Mitchell Systems, the hair care company owned by Paul and his business partner John Paul DeJoria.

With the help of James Amick, the inventor of the "Windmobile", Jonathan was able to achieve his goal of designing a way to utilize the Australian winds to help power the Mana La, a function unique to this car in the field of entrants. By covering the resulting arched wing of the Mana La in solar panels the idea was to be able to expose the panels to the sun at all times of the day.

The car is 19' long, 6 1/2' wide, and 6 1/2' tall. It is ["c]omposed of urethane foam, carbon fiber, and high-temperature vinyl ester resin, the entire vehicle weighs only 500 pounds, sports an on-board computer...(and) carries NASA-grade storage batteries."

The arch is covered by 140 solar panels. The 64 silver-zinc batteries, which hold the power collected by the solar panels, "...feed a pair of 2-horsepower, brushless direct-current motors. Each motor utilizes two windings, one for lower speeds and higher torque, and another for higher speeds at lower torque."

"...[T]he graphics, lettering and art work on.... the car..." were done by John Mydock.

Nicknamed "the hair dryer" due to its hair care sponsor, the $250,000 Mana La qualified for second starting position with a 58 mph run, behind GM's estimated $8 million entry, Sunraycer.

By 4:pm the first day, the Mana La was out of the race. "The crew confess[ed] they ran too hard through the hills trying to catch the Sunraycer...., exhausting their batteries and never got the wind boost their car was designed to exploit. Their battery specialist estimat[ed] it (would) take 40 hours in the sun to recharge."

The Mana La was featured in a National Geographic Society film about the race.

In 1988 the Mana La competed again, this time in Visalia, California, in the American Solar Cup course as part of the 14th annual International Human Power Vehicle Speed Championships.

The car completed only 102 of the 160 mile course, and was driven first by Jonathan, then by John Paul de Joria.

In 2010 the car was donated to the Petersen Museum in Los Angeles by John Paul Mitchell Systems.

== Suntera ==
In 1993, Jonathan created Suntera, The Solar Electric Chariot Company, Inc. with a mind to design affordable solar-electric hybrid cars and trucks for commuters based on the designs he had created for vehicles for use on his own property – a solar powered pickup, tractor, lawnmower, etc. He hoped to create cars from low-maintenance materials and with fewer parts to avoid costly manufacturing and maintenance. Additionally, he wanted to reduce emissions that pollute the environment, arguing that even if his cars ran on batteries charged by electricity, the generators of the electrical power run cleaner than millions of individual gas-burning automobiles. To that end, he designed and built the SunRay Solar Neighborhood Electric Vehicle.

In March 1995, the SunRay was exhibited at the Geneva Motor Show

In 1995 "YB Planing Inc. of Tokyo signed a joint venture agreement....with Suntera, the Solar Electric Chariot Co. of Hawaii to import up to 2,000 SunRays to Japan..." "[T]he two-seat SunRay, which can be charged with ordinary household outlets or solar panels, reaches 70 m.p.h. and has a range of up to 100 miles between charges."

The SunRay, with its three wheels, is classified as a motorcycle, but due to the strength of the egg shaped design and crush-resistant materials used, is, as Anthony Locricchio, Suntera's CEO, explained, "...the world's safest 'motorcycle' because the whole body of the car becomes a helmet."

In March 1995 "Suntera delivered a prototype pickup truck version, known as a Pickette...to Hawaii Electric Light Co." and is "...building one for the Navy and two for the Air Force."

Specifications of the Sunray:

Length: 96 inches Width: 67 inches Height: 69 inches Weight: 1.600 lbs Seating Capacity: 2 Power: 10 lead-acid batteries Motor: 13 horsepower Performance: 0–60 mph in 18 seconds Top Speed: 70 mph Range: 100 miles at 25 mph; 65 at 45 mph

== Death and legacy ==
Jonathan died April 21, 1997, in Dallas, Texas, while returning from Dominican Republic, where he underwent experimental treatment for cancer.

Suntera, The Solar Electric Chariot Co., continued under Jonathan's business partner, attorney, and friend, Anthony Locricchio.

He is survived by his four children and one granddaughter.
