= Embassy of Angola, Paris =

Diplomatic mission in Paris, France

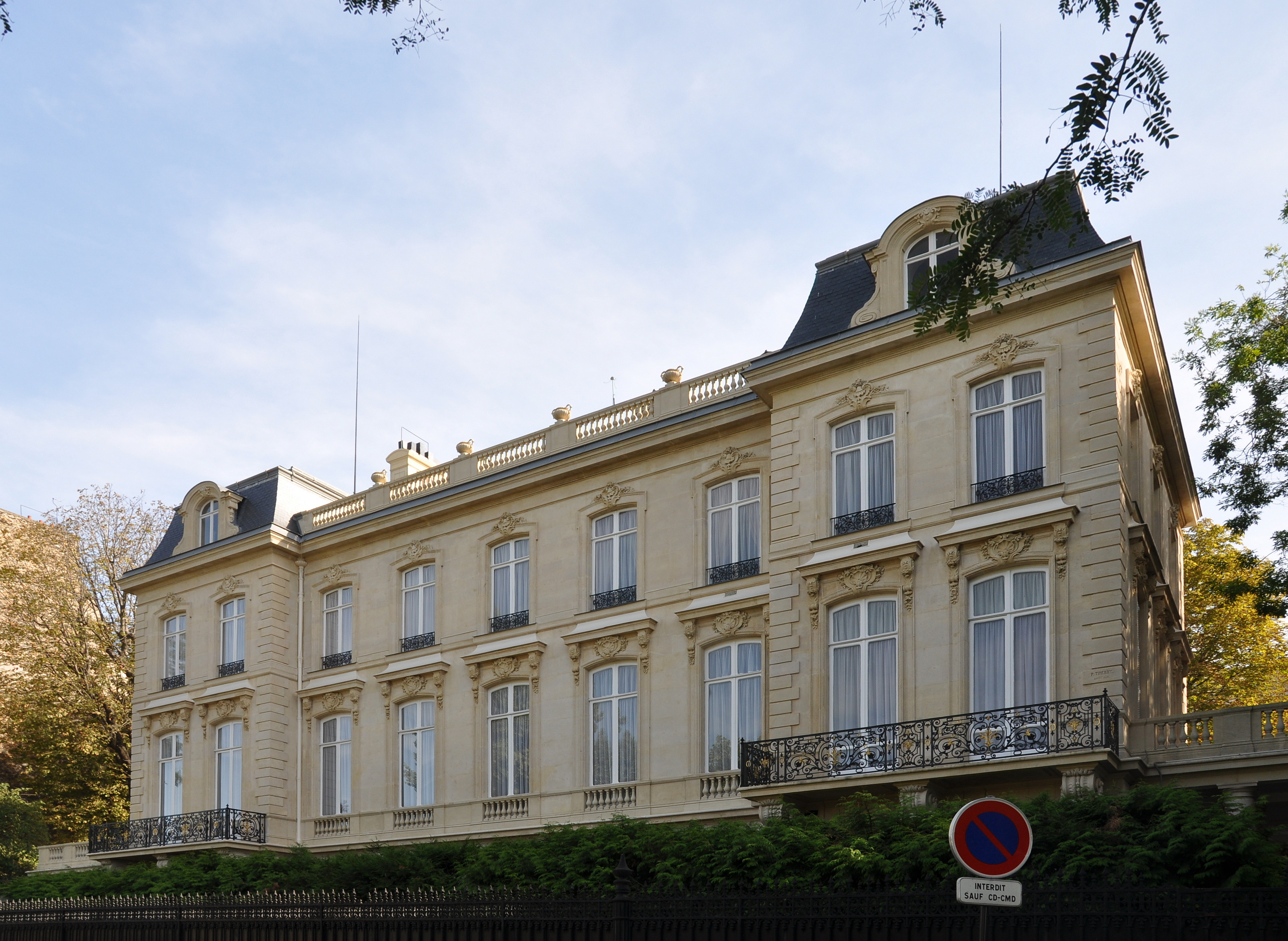
- Location: Paris, France
- Address: 19 Avenue Foch, 16th arrondissement
- Coordinates: 48.87255°N 2.28973°E
- Ambassador: Guilhermina Prata

The embassy of Angola in France is the diplomatic mission of Angola in France. It is located in Paris and the ambassador is, since 2023, Guilhermina Prata.

== Embassy ==
The embassy is located on Avenue Foch in the 16th arrondissement of Paris. Its building (partially listed) is the Hôtel de Monpelas, also known as the Hôtel Ephrussi-Rothschild, one of the first private hôtel particuliers built and one of the last remaining, among those erected along the avenue (then named Avenue de l'Impératrice) in the years following its creation in 1854.

In early 2022, the statues Zephyr, Flora and Cupid, and Abundance were displayed in the Dauphine's apartment at the Palace of Versailles. Sold in 1881 to Alphonse de Rothschild, they had since been in the garden of the embassy, which, after their rediscovery, generously offered them to the former royal palace.
