= Youcam AI Pro =

Generative AI image and video app

- Developer: Perfect Corp
- Release: September 28, 2023; 3 years ago
- Operating system: iOS; Android
- Type: Text-to-image generation; Text-to-video generation
- License: Freemium
- Website: www.perfectcorp.com/consumer/apps/yca

Youcam AI Pro is the name of a mobile app from Taiwan-based Perfect Corp that produces images and videos from text prompts and pictures by means of generative artificial intelligence. On September 28, 2023, it became available on the iOS system, later being developed for Android as well. The app exists in Chinese under the name 玩美AI繪圖, in Taiwan. Starting from October 2025 the app features different third-party models, including AI models from OpenAI, Google, Kuaishou and ShengShu Technology.

== History ==
The company announced Youcam AI Pro on September 28, 2023 on the iOS system with a key function was the production of images from textual input in multiple artistic styles such as Van Gogh, Pop Art, Anime, Pixel Art and Cartoon. It contained AI Magic Avatar which generated avatars from user images. The function was based on customized models of Stable Diffusion. The Japanese versionwas announced on October 10, 2023. China Daily News (中華日報) reported in December 2023, the Chinese version produced images based on users' textual prompts within seconds and allowed editing of the users' input as well as sharing of generated images.

In May 2024, Il Sole 24 Ore listed Youcam AI Pro among generators of images from text and indicated that the mobile application was free and available on iPhones and iPads only. By June 2025, the application was available both on Google Play and the App Store and included a function which allowed the conversion of an ordinary image into a short video with the help of templates.

On October 30, 2025, Perfect Corp. released an update which allowed users to choose among several models created by third-party developers. Among the image models used in the application were OpenAI's GPT-Image-1, Google's Gemini 2.5 Flash Image (Nano Banana) and Imagen 4, and the Flux models Flux 1.1 Pro and Flux.1 Kontext. Among video models there were Kling 2.5 Turbo, Vidu Q2, Hailuo 02, PixVerse 5 and Google's Veo 3. The update introduced the creation of videos from text, and since then the app has functioned in four modes: images from text, images from images, videos from text and videos from images. In December 2025, the company added the Nano Banana Pro model and New Year card templates.

In January 2026, Perfect Corp. introduced two features for video production aimed at creators, small businesses and online sellers. On October 8, 2026, Perfect Corp. added the Vidu Q4 Preview model to the image-to-video tool. The model makes video clips from 3 to 16 seconds with a resolution of up to 4K.

== Reception ==
In its November 2025 guide to making action-figure images, Mashable Indonesia recommended Youcam AI Pro as an easy mobile option. In the review, it was stated that the application detects faces automatically and the user does not need to write a prompt, as the user picks an image and chooses a template for it.
