= Eloise Broady DeJoria =

American model, actress, and businesswoman

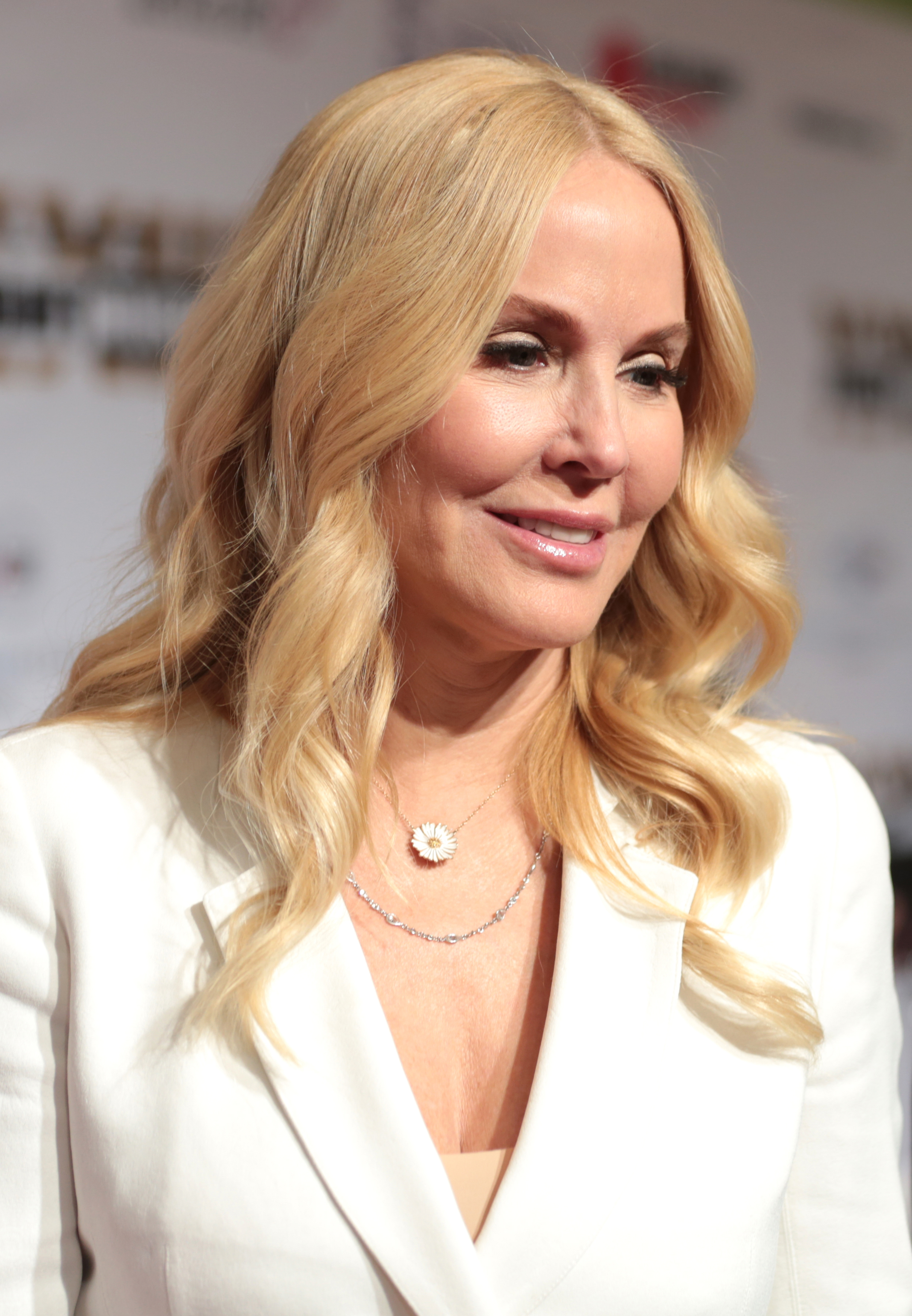
- Other name: Eloise DeJoria
- Years active: 1984–2016
- Spouse: John Paul DeJoria (m. 1993)

Eloise Broady

Playboy centerfold appearance
- April 1988
- Preceded by: Susie Owens
- Succeeded by: Diana Lee

Personal details
- Born: Eloise Lucille Broady; May 13, 1957 (age 69) Houston, Texas, U.S.
- Height: 5 ft 8 in (1.73 m)

Eloise Broady DeJoria (born May 13, 1957) is an American model, actress, producer, businesswoman and philanthropist. As an actress, she is known for playing Tawny in the 1989 American dark comedy film Weekend at Bernie's. She's Playmate of the Month for April 1988.

== Personal life and career ==
She was chosen as Playmate of the Month for April 1988 at the age of 30. Her business enterprises include Ultimate Face Professional, Arbor Behavioral Healthcare, and Renew Logic.

She is involved in charities, such as Help Clifford Help Kids, The Palmer Drug Abuse Program, The Austin Recovery Center, The Austin Children's Shelter, Helping Hands, as well as Club 100, Long Center for the Performing Arts, The Paramount Theater, and The Austin Film Society. She is business partners with husband John Paul DeJoria, whom she married in 1993.

== Film career ==
She played Tawny in Weekend at Bernie's. She also appeared in Songwriter (1984), Friday Night Lights, Grand Champion, Our Wild Hearts, and You Don't Mess with the Zohan. She acted in Robert Davi's directorial debut, The Dukes. She also starred in the music video for Kiss's "Reason to Live."

Kimberley Conrad	Kari Kennell	Susie Owens	Eloise Broady	Diana Lee	Emily Arth
Terri Lynn Doss	Helle Michaelsen	Laura Richmond	Shannon Long	Pia Reyes	Kata Kärkkäinen
