= You Don't Mess with the Zohan =

2008 Columbia Pictures film directed by Dennis Dugan

- Theatrical release poster
- Directed by: Dennis Dugan
- Written by: Adam Sandler; Robert Smigel; Judd Apatow
- Produced by: Adam Sandler; Jack Giarraputo
- Starring: Adam Sandler; John Turturro; Emmanuelle Chriqui; Nick Swardson; Lainie Kazan; Rob Schneider
- Cinematography: Michael Barrett
- Edited by: Tom Costain
- Music by: Rupert Gregson-Williams
- Production companies: Columbia Pictures; Relativity Media; Happy Madison Productions
- Distributed by: Sony Pictures Releasing
- Release date: June 6, 2008
- Running time: 113 minutes
- Country: United States
- Language: English
- Budget: $90 million
- Box office: $204 million

You Don't Mess with the Zohan is a 2008 American satirical action comedy film directed by Dennis Dugan and written by Adam Sandler, Robert Smigel, and Judd Apatow. Sandler stars alongside John Turturro, Emmanuelle Chriqui, Nick Swardson, Lainie Kazan, and Rob Schneider. It is the fourth collaboration of Sandler and Dugan. The film follows an IDF super soldier (Sandler), who fakes his own death to pursue his dream of becoming a hairstylist in the United States.

Produced by Columbia Pictures, Relativity Media, and Happy Madison Productions, You Don't Mess with the Zohan was released by Sony Pictures Releasing in the United States on June 6, 2008. It received mixed reviews from critics and it was a box office success grossing a total box office of $204 million worldwide against a total budget of $90 million.

== Plot ==
Zohanele "Zohan" Dvir is an IDF commando known for his promiscuity and superhuman traits. Despite his success, he is tired of the Israeli-Arab conflict, and he dreams of leaving the military to become a hairstylist for John Paul Mitchell Systems in the United States, much to the disapproval of his parents.

Zohan is tasked with capturing his long-time arch-rival, Fatoush "Phantom" Hakbarah, a Palestinian who also possesses superhuman traits. After engaging Phantom in a fight, he fakes his own death and subsequently smuggles himself to New York City, later adopting the name "Scrappy Coco" after the two dogs he spent time with at the airplane's cargo hold. Phantom's supposed success in killing Zohan garners him much fame across the Arab world, leading him to open the "Phantom Muchentuchen" restaurant chain.

After arriving to New York City, Zohan immediately seeks a job at the local Paul Mitchell salon, but is turned down. Later, he witnesses a traffic collision involving two drivers and a biker named Michael. One of the drivers starts verbally assaulting Michael and yells anti-Arab slurs at Zohan, who promptly beats him up. Michael subsequently befriends Zohan, taking him to his apartment, where he lives with his mother Gail. Zohan encounters a fellow Israeli immigrant, Oori, who recognizes Zohan and vows to keep his true identity a secret before bringing him to an area in Lower Manhattan predominantly populated by other Middle Eastern immigrants, including Israeli and Palestinian Americans.

At Oori's suggestion, Zohan attempts to secure a job at the salon of a Palestinian woman named Dalia. As he lacks experience, she only allows him to sweep the salon's floors without pay, because her salon is facing financial difficulties. When a stylist unexpectedly quits, one of the customers asks Zohan to cut her hair, and he accepts. Zohan's reputation rapidly spreads, causing Dalia's business to prosper. Dalia makes her rent payments in full, upsetting corporate businessman Grant Walbridge, who has been trying to buy out all the local tenants to build a mall.

Zohan is identified by a Palestinian-American taxi driver named Salim. He then meets with his friends Hamdi and Nasi, convincing them to help him kill Zohan. After unsuccessfully attempting to contact Hezbollah, Salim contacts Phantom in Amman, Jordan. He threatens to publicly disclose the truth about Zohan being alive, but Phantom makes a deal with him and prepares to find Zohan himself.

Meanwhile, Zohan has fallen in love with Dalia, but she rejects Zohan because of his military background. He decides to quit, hoping to keep her safe from any inter-ethnic conflicts. Zohan later confronts Phantom in a championship Hacky Sack game sponsored by Walbridge. However, the confrontation is cut short when he learns that the Middle Eastern neighborhood is being attacked by unknown assailants.

As tensions escalate, Zohan calms the Israelis and the Palestinians, as both sides blame each other for the violence. When Phantom appears, he confronts Zohan, who refuses to fight after being deeply inspired by Dalia's pacifism. Dalia then discloses that she is Phantom's sister and convinces her brother to cooperate with Zohan against the arsonists, who are revealed to be a group of white supremacists on Walbridge's payroll. The Phantom works with Zohan to save the block. The arsonists are defeated, and Walbridge is arrested by the police; however, the overexcited Phantom accidentally destroys all the remaining shops with his superhuman screams.

With the Israelis and Palestinians now working together, the block is rebuilt and transformed into a collectively-owned mall. Zohan and Dalia, having now married, open a beauty salon together. Zohan's parents visit from Israel and approve of his new job and lifestyle.

== Cast ==
- Adam Sandler as Zohanele "Zohan" Dvir (Hebrew: זוהן דביר), a superhuman counter-terrorist who aspires to be a stylist and fakes his death to pursue his dream under the alias of "Scrappy Coco".
- John Turturro as Fatoush "Phantom" Hakbarah (Arabic: فتوش حكبرة), a superhuman terrorist and Zohan's rival, who, after Zohan's supposed death, opens a chain of kebab Muchentuchen restaurants named "Phantom Muchentuchen". He aspires to sell shoes.
- Emmanuelle Chriqui as Dalia Hakbarah (Arabic: داليا حكبرة), the owner of a hair salon who becomes Zohan's love interest and is revealed to be Phantom's sister.
- Nick Swardson as Michael Klayman, a tenant who invites Zohan to stay over after he saves him from a disgruntled motorist. He often disagrees with his tactics.
- Lainie Kazan as Gail Klayman, Michael's mother, with whom Zohan starts a sexual relationship.
- Rob Schneider as Salim Yousfobdal (Arabic: سليم يوسف عبد), a taxi driver who holds a vendetta against Zohan after he stole his goat which Salim presumes is dead. In reality, Zohan took it in as a pet.
- Ido Mosseri as Oori Shulimson (Hebrew: אורי שולמזון), the Israeli owner of the electronics shop "Going Out of Business" (intentionally named such because he believes it would help increase interest from shoppers) who helps Zohan pursue his dream.
- Michael Buffer as Grant Walbridge, a crooked businessman, Lower Manhattan landlord, and proprietor of the Walbridge Hotel who aspires to open a roller coaster mall and tries to force the tenants (Oori, Dalia, etc.) out of the land.
- Charlotte Rae as Mrs. Greenhouse, a woman who goes to Dalia's salon
- Dave Matthews as James T. O'Skanlon, the white supremacist whom Grant Walbridge hires to burn down the Israeli shops.
- Sayed Badreya as Hamdi, Salim's friend and a fellow taxi driver.
- Daoud Heidami as Nasi, Salim's other friend who works at a convenience stand.
- Kevin Nealon as Kevin, the community watch member whom Zohan and Michael work with.
- Robert Smigel as Yosi, a man who works at "Going Out of Business" where he originally wanted to be a hand model until he got too comfortable at "Going Out of Business".
- Dina Doronne as Mrs. Dvir, Zohan's mother.
- Shelley Berman as Mr. Dvir, Zohan's father.
- John Paul DeJoria as an alternate version of Paul Mitchell. Dejoria was one of the original founders of the Paul Mitchell Salon. In this version, Paul Mitchell is still alive and opened the chain alone.
- Alec Mapa as Claude, a man who works at Dalia's hair salon and gets embarrassed when Zohan tries to give advice to him.
- Ahmed Ahmed as Waleed, a man who works a clothes store on the Israeli street and whom the fellow shop owners say looks "Mexican".
- Ben Wise as Yitzhak, a fellow shop owner.
- Joseph Marshak as Pinchas, a fellow shop owner.
- Guri Weinberg as Aharon, a fellow shop owner.
- Danny A. Abeckaser as Ze'ev, a man who works at "Going Out of Business".
- Ido Ezra as Hassan, a fellow shop owner.
- Mousa Kraish as Bashir, a fellow shop owner.
- Roni Levi as Ephraim, a fellow shop owner.
- Mike Iorio as Bouncer
- Reuven Bar-Yotam as Levi, a fellow shop owner.
- Shulie Cowen as Debbie, Dalia's former stylist who quit for unknown reasons
- Maysoon Zayid as Nadira, Dalia's salon receptionist.
- Helen Siff as Mrs. Skitzer, a customer who goes to Dalia's salon.
- Cynthia Frost as Mrs. Paulson, a customer who goes to Dalia's salon.
- Maria Zambrana as Salim's taxi passenger who gets angered due to the fact that Salim works while he drives.

=== Cameo appearances ===
- Rick Gifford as Philip, a man who works for Walbridge
- Barry Livingston as Gray "Pancake" Kleibolt, a man who works for Walbridge
- Chris Rock as a taxi driver who first brings Zohan to NYC
- Daniel Browning Smith as a real estate agent
- Tyler Spindel as a doorman
- Dennis Dugan as a homeless man
- Mariah Carey as herself, she sings the National Anthem at the Hacky Sack game.
- John McEnroe as himself
- George Takei as himself, he appears in an apartment that O'Skanlon was shot into.
- Bruce Vilanch as himself, he appears in an apartment that O'Skanlon was shot into.
- Edmund Lyndeck as a pharmacist who sold Salim the Neosporin when he was trying to get nitroglycerin from him.
- Kevin James as himself (uncredited), he is seen as a celebrity judge at the Hacky Sack game.
- Jackie Sandler as a mother who is in line for the Goat Ride (uncredited)
- Sadie Sandler as Goat Ride Girl (uncredited)
- Henry Winkler as himself (uncredited), a client of Zohan's first job as a limo driver who ends up being the subject of speeding.

== Production ==
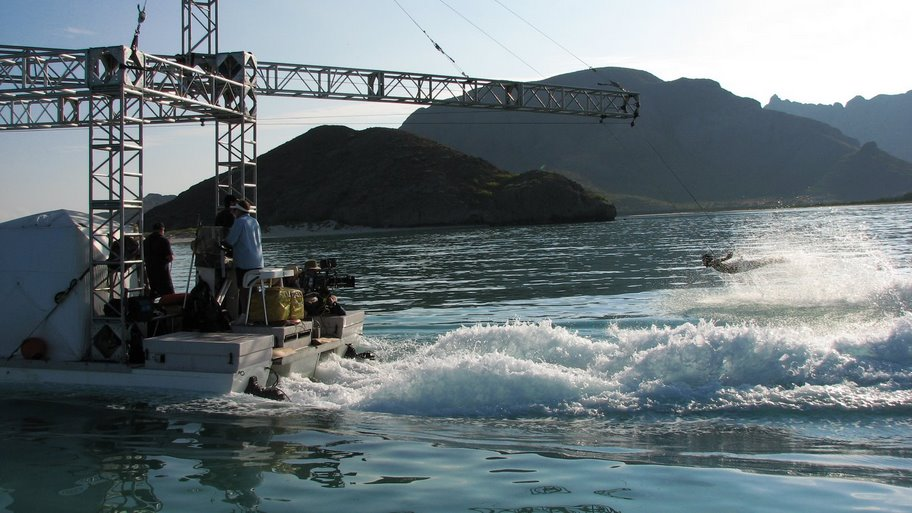
Filming of one of the scenes while in Mexico

Adam Sandler, Robert Smigel, and Judd Apatow wrote the first draft of the script in 2000, but the movie was delayed after the events of 9/11 because those involved felt that the subject would be too sensitive. Apatow left the project after the first draft in 2000 to work on his show Undeclared and had, for the most part, not been involved in the project since. The film is based in part on the story of Nezi Arbib, an Israeli soldier who after his service moved to southern California and opened a hair salon. Sandler trained with Arbib and his brothers, also former soldiers, for two weeks to learn hairstyling and work with clients.

The movie features elements that first appeared in the SNL sketches "Sabra Shopping Network" and "Sabra Price Is Right", which starred Tom Hanks and were written by Robert Smigel. They originated lines such as 'Sony guts' and 'Disco, Disco, good, good'. The first sketch is also notable for featuring one of Adam Sandler's first uncredited television appearances while the second featured Sandler, Schneider, Smigel and Kevin Nealon in supporting parts. Robert Smigel worked with Sandler on past films including Billy Madison, Happy Gilmore, and Little Nicky, but this was the first time in which he was credited for helping to write the script. He was an executive producer on the film which allowed him to further contribute to the movie's comedic sensibility.

The Israeli newspaper Haaretz commented that the movie was known in Hollywood circles as "the Israeli movie". Emmanuelle Chriqui, who played Zohan's Palestinian love interest, was raised as an Orthodox Jew. The film poked fun at the popularity of hummus in Israeli culture. In the movie, characters used it to brush their teeth and as a method to douse the flames of a fire, as well as a hair care product.

== Soundtrack ==
Rupert Gregson-Williams composed the film's score, which he recorded with the Hollywood Studio Symphony at the Sony Scoring Stage in April 2008. The soundtrack contains many songs in Hebrew, mostly by the popular Israeli band Hadag Nahash, the psychedelic trance duo Infected Mushroom, and Dana International. The film features "Strip" by Adam Ant, "Look on the Floor (Hypnotic Tango) (Angel City Remix)" by Bananarama, the Ace of Base songs "Hallo Hallo" and "Beautiful Life", the Rockwell song Somebody's Watching Me and the Mariah Carey songs "Fantasy" and "I'll Be Lovin' U Long Time".

The soundtrack contains (near the end) music rearranged for the movie by Julius Dobos, based on the song "Jimmy Jimmy Jimmy Aaja" from the Bollywood movie Disco Dancer (1982) starring Mithun Chakraborty.

== Reception ==
Rotten Tomatoes gives You Don't Mess with the Zohan a score of 37% based on 189 reviews. The site's consensus is that the film "features intermittent laughs, and will please Sandler diehards, but after a while the leaky premise wears thin." Metacritic gives the film a rating of 54 out of 100, based on 37 reviews—indicating mixed or average reviews. Audiences polled by CinemaScore gave the film a grade B− on scale of A to F.

John Podhoretz, in The Weekly Standard, wrote that the movie has a "mess" of a plot and features, "as usual for Sandler, plenty of dumb humor of the sort that gives dumb humor a bad name, but that delights his 14-year-old-boy fan base." But the film also has an "unusual" amount of "tantalizing comic ideas" so that "every 10 minutes or so, it makes you explode with laughter." Entertainment Weekly gave the movie a C+ grade, calling it "another 'mess' from Sandler" which is, unlike Monty Python, a "circus that never flies".

On the positive side, Time called the film to be a "laff scuffle". Roger Ebert of the Chicago Sun-Times gave the film 3 out of 4 stars, and called it "a mighty hymn of and to vulgarity, and either you enjoy it, or you don't." Ebert admitted "I found myself enjoying it a surprising amount of the time, even though I was thoroughly ashamed of myself." David Edelstein of New York Magazine went as far as to say "Adam Sandler is mesmerizing". A.O. Scott of The New York Times said it was "the finest post-Zionist action-hairdressing sex comedy I have ever seen."

=== Box office ===
You Don't Mess with the Zohan grossed $38 million on its opening weekend, ranked second behind Kung Fu Panda. As of September 7, 2008, it reached a US tally of $100 million. The film grossed $204 million worldwide.

== Home media ==
You Don't Mess with the Zohan was released on DVD on October 7, 2008, with a 2-disc unrated edition, a single-disc unrated edition, and a theatrical edition, as well as a Blu-ray edition and UMD for PSP, by Sony Pictures Home Entertainment. It has sold over 1.2 million DVD units gathering revenue of $26 million.
