= Beauty Channel =

Streaming service

The Beauty Channel
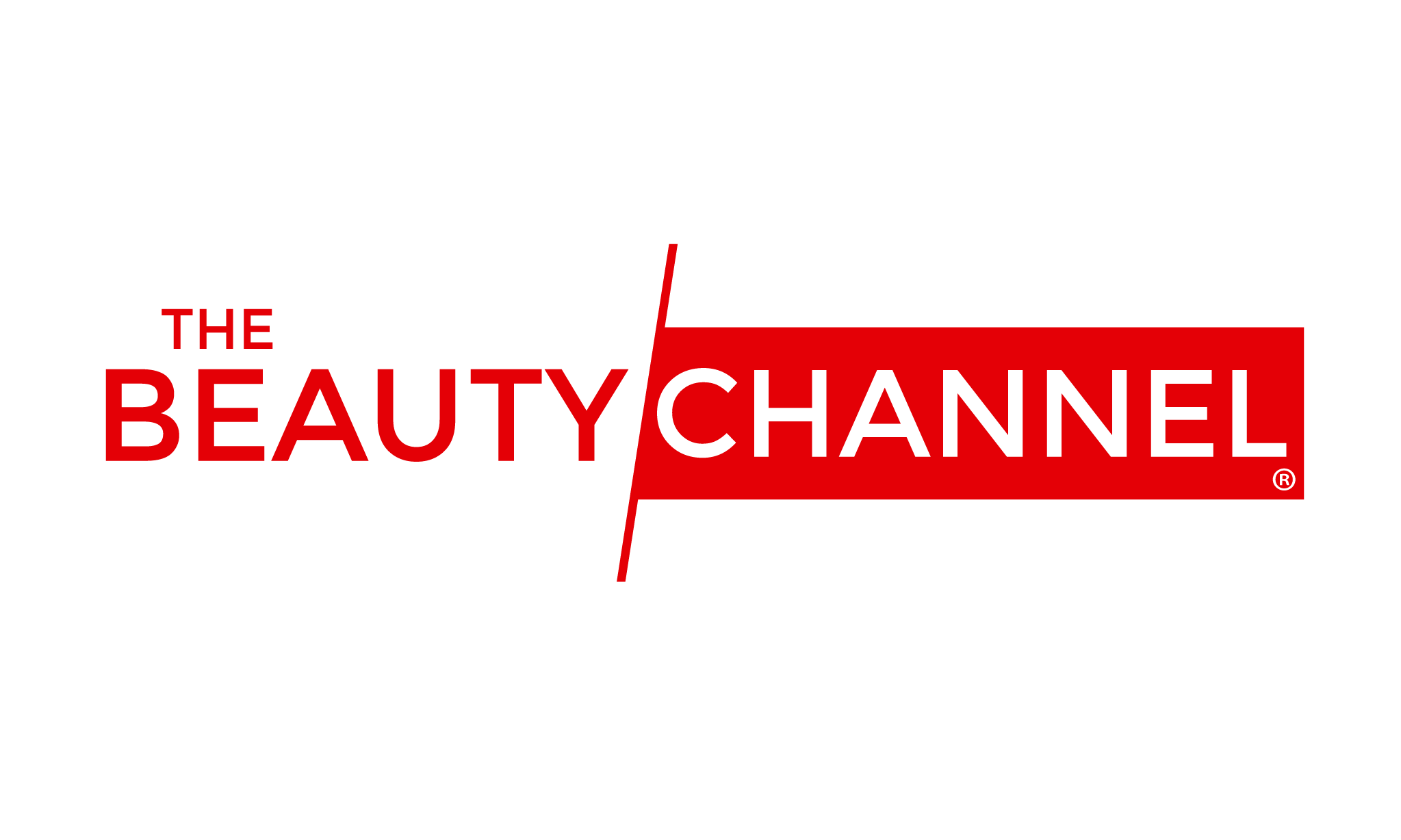
- Country: United States
- Headquarters: Los Angeles, CA

Programming
- Language: English

Ownership
- Owner: United Global Media Group, Inc.
- Key people: Rob Angelino

History
- Launched: February 2, 2012; 14 years ago
- Former names: Salon TV

Beauty Channel (frequently stylized as The Beauty Channel) is a commercial American over-the-top and mobile streaming beauty focused broadcast channel which is a flagship property of Beauty TV, a subsidiary of Beauty Network. It, as well as its parent company is headquartered in Los Angeles. The channel's content can be accessed online through common music/podcast streaming services and content streaming digital media players like Roku, Fire Stick, and Chromecast.

== History ==
The Beauty Channel was founded by Rob Angelino of United Global Media Group on February 1, 2012. Beauty Channel was previously founded under the name Salon TV as a salon-direct marketing and advertising venture. Original plans for the company were to offer fee-based direct broadcast programming to beauty salons in the United States with information and instructional content geared towards consumers, stylists, and technicians. Initial programming was offered in English and Spanish language options with specific focus on different racial demographics.

Salon TV was forced to reorganize and refocus their media outreach plans after the Dot-com burst of the early 2000s, and later, rebranded as The Beauty Channel.

Beauty TV, a subsidiary of and precursor to the Beauty Channel, was originally soft-launched in Asia beginning in January 2007. It was originally carried online by the TVU Network and MediaZone, while RokTV hosted the platform for early mobile phone access. In 2008, the channel was picked up for distribution on TiVo and was being offered on other outlets, including Veho, Vuze, BabbleGum, and Blinkx. It was also hosted on the peer-to-peer television technology outlet Joost, but was dropped when the company (Joost) folded in 2012.

John Paul Dejoria, co-founder of the Paul Mitchell beauty product line, became an active advisory board member in 2008.

== Programming ==
Beauty Channel is a specialized "lifestyle" channel, much like the Food Network, QVC, or HGTV. Its focus is based specifically on the beauty and fashion industry, with an arm in direct-to-consumer sales and in-flight programming.

The Beauty Channel provides content and interviews of beauty-related celebrities, experts and stylists in the fields of hair, nails, salon services, anti-aging treatments, and cosmetic plastic surgery. The channel is currently hosted on 24-hour streaming services including iTunes, Roku, Samsung TV, and other related OTT programming outlets. Programming content for Beauty Channel is also available on a dedicated YouTube channel. The Beauty Channel is not currently affiliated with any terrestrial broadcasting organizations and as of 2019, is only available on streaming services.

Beauty TV serves as a flagship property of The Beauty Channel which is, in turn, a property of Beauty Network. Each of these entities hosts its own, dedicated streaming content.
