= Jonathan Tennyson =

Jonathan Tennyson may refer to:

- Jonathan Tennyson (physicist) (born 1955), British physicist at University College London
- Jonathan Tennyson (car designer) (1945–1997), American solar powered car designer
