= John Paul DeJoria =

American businessman (born 1944)

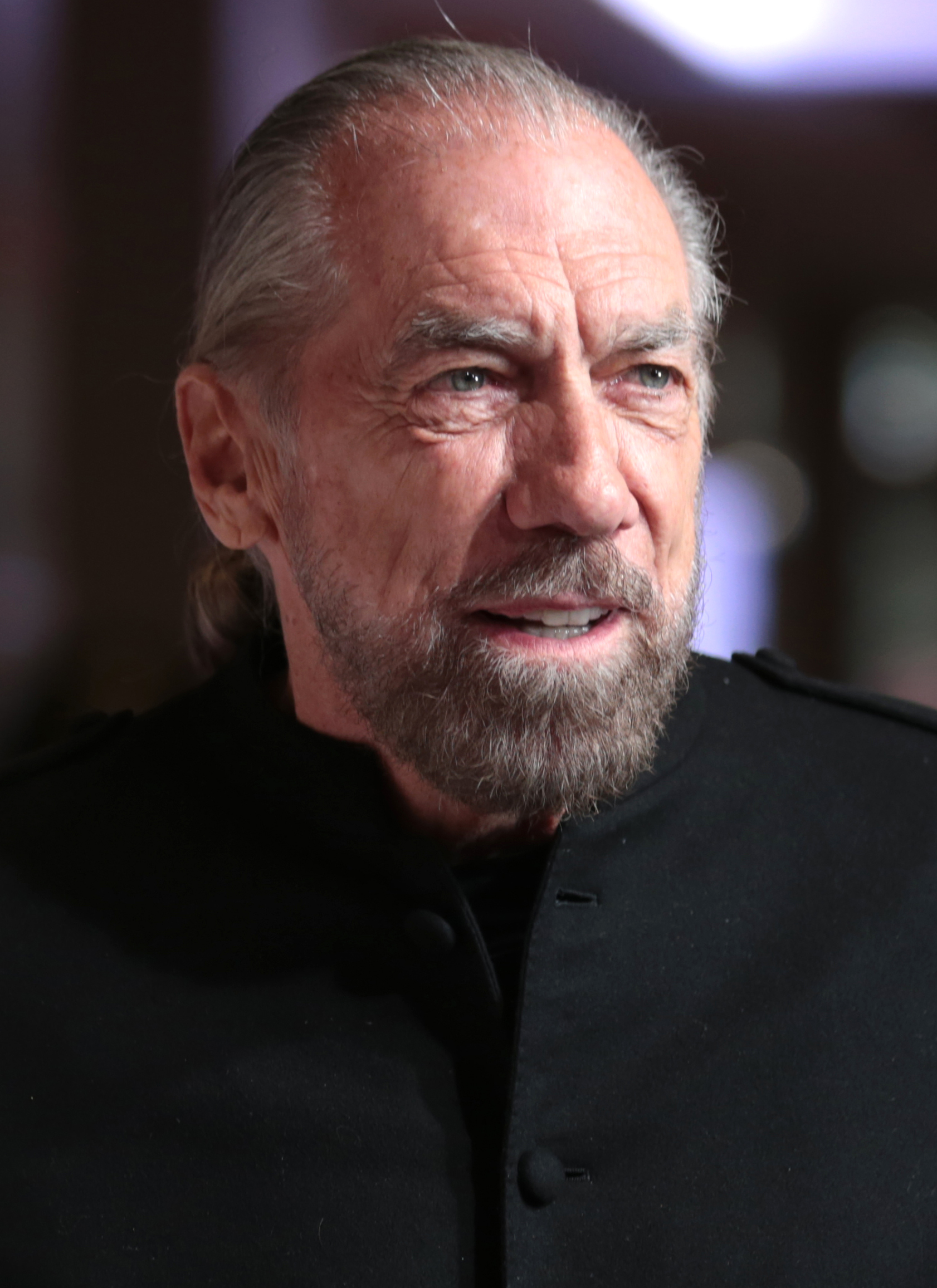
- DeJoria in 2017
- Born: John Paul Jones DeJoria; April 13, 1944 (age 82); Los Angeles, California, US
- Years active: 1980–present
- Known for: John Paul Mitchell Systems
- Spouse: Eloise Broady (m. 1993)
- Children: 4, including Alexis

John Paul Jones DeJoria (born April 13, 1944) is an American billionaire businessman, best known as a co-founder of the Paul Mitchell line of hair products and The Patrón Spirits Company.

== Early life and education ==
John Paul Jones DeJoria was born the second son of an Italian immigrant father and a Greek immigrant mother on April 13, 1944 in the Echo Park neighborhood of Los Angeles, California. His parents divorced by the time he was two years old. When his single mother was unable to support both children, they were sent to an East Los Angeles foster home and stayed there during the week until he was nine and returned to his mother. At nine, he began selling Christmas cards and newspapers with his older brother to support his family. He was educated at John Marshall High School in Los Angeles.

== Career ==
DeJoria spent two years in the United States Navy, serving on the USS Hornet. After that, he held a series of jobs including janitor, door-to-door encyclopedia salesman, and insurance salesman.

DeJoria entered the world of hair care as an entry-level employee of Redken Laboratories. He was fired from this position. In 1980, he formed John Paul Mitchell Systems with hairdresser Paul Mitchell and a loan for $700 and while living in a 20-year-old Rolls-Royce automobile.

DeJoria co-founded the Patrón Spirits Company in 1989; is a founding partner of the House of Blues nightclub chain; and has interests in Madagascar Oil Ltd., Pyrat Rum, Smokey Mountain Bison Farm, llc, Ultimat Vodka, Solar Utility, Sun King Solar, Touchstone Natural Gas, Three Star Energy, Diamond Audio, a Harley-Davidson dealership, a diamond company (DeJoria), mobile technology developer ROK AMERICAS, the John Paul Pet Company which does hair and personal grooming for animals, and J&D Acquisitions LLC, the parent company for the Larson, Striper, Triumph, Marquis and Carver boat companies formed with Minneapolis-based investor Irwin L. Jacobs. In 2008, DeJoria became an advisory board member for The Beauty Channel; a streaming beauty and fashion-focused television station.

DeJoria has been active in the film industry as an executive producer and actor. He made a cameo appearance as himself, in the 2008 comedy You Don't Mess with the Zohan, and also in The Big Tease as the fictional John Paul Mitchell. DeJoria also made a cameo appearance in the Showtime series Weeds season 2. He narrated and appeared in television commercials for Patrón in November 2011. He appeared on the November 1, 2013, broadcast of the ABC reality series Shark Tank as a guest investor, replacing series regular Robert Herjavec. With a 2017 net worth of US$3.1 billion, he is the 3rd-richest "shark" of all time on the show, behind series regular Mark Cuban (2017 net worth: US $3.3 billion) and fellow "guest shark" Sir Richard Branson (2017 net worth: US $5.1 billion). DeJoria participated in an Emmy winning episode where DeJoria invested $150,000 for 20% of Tree T-PEE, an irrigation company.

In 2018, DeJoria co-founded ROKiT Group with business partner Jonathan Kendrick.; its brands include ROKiT Phones, ROKiT Telemedicine, and ROKiT Drinks.

In September 2025, DeJoria reported beneficial ownership of 15,457,152 shares in HighPeak Energy, representing 12.25% of its common stock. The SEC filing also disclosed substantial limited-partnership interests held through his family trust in two funds owning additional HighPeak shares. HighPeak is an oil and natural gas producer operating in West Texas whose 2025 annual report states that it routinely uses hydraulic fracturing in its drilling and completion programmes.

=== Patrón Tequila ===
The original Patrón Tequila was produced by Casa 7 Leguas, one of the oldest Mexican distilleries; DeJoria and Martin Crowley purchased the brand rights in 1989 via their St. Maarten Spirits company. He launched the sale in the US in the ultra-premium category, distributing it to restaurants and friends to make the launch more exclusive and driven by word-of-mouth. In 2018, he sold Patrón Tequila to Bacardi.

==== Patrón Tequila Express ====
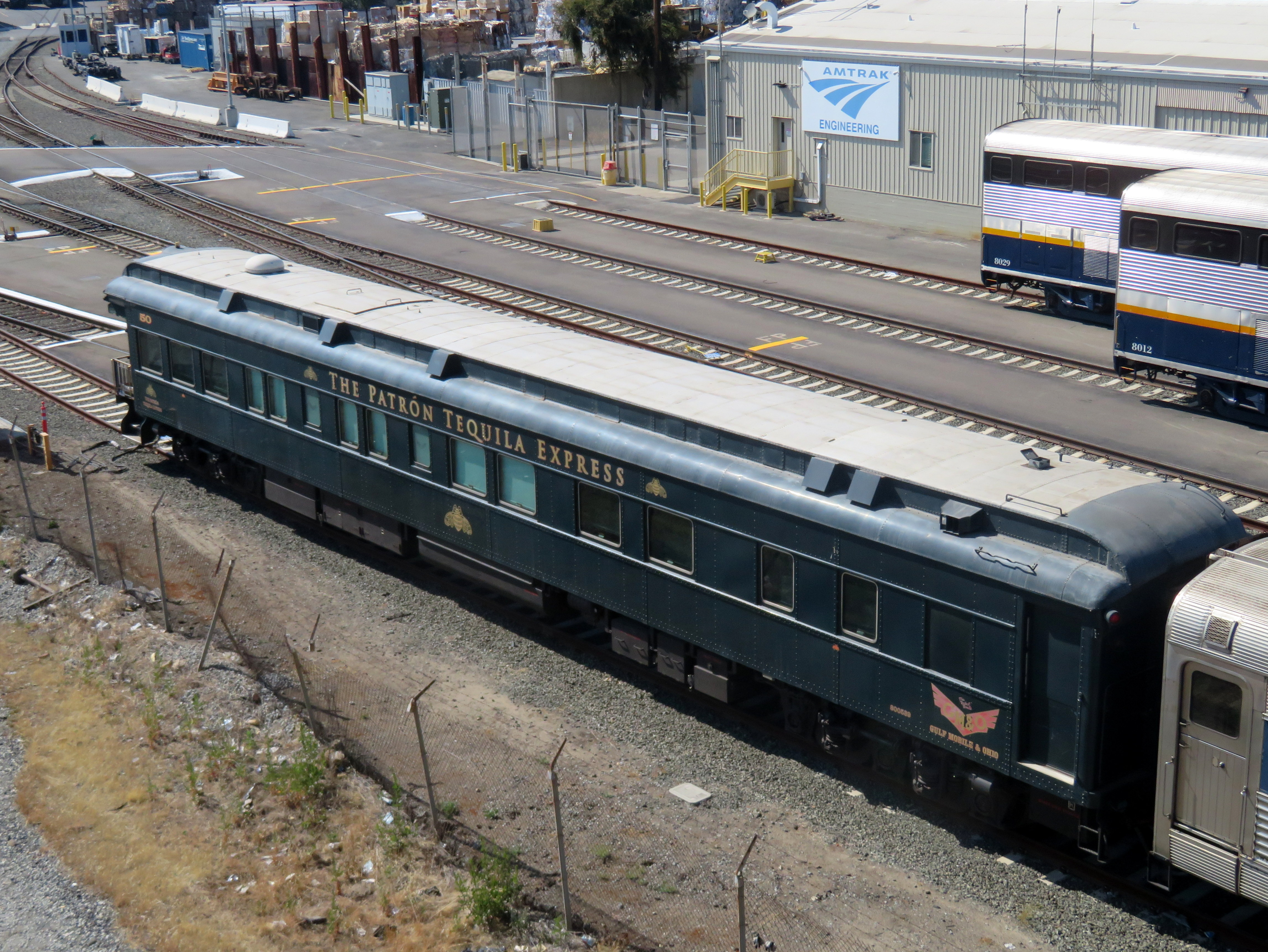
The Patrón Tequila Express private railroad car is owned by DeJoria.

DeJoria owns the Patrón Tequila Express, a historic private railroad car. It was built in 1927, and was previously used by the Gulf, Mobile and Ohio Railroad as Car No. 50. DeJoria bought the train car in 1996 and spent $2 million to renovate it. The train car is 85 feet (25.91 m) long and contains three staterooms (each with a bathroom and shower), a kitchen, a dining room, an observation lounge, and an outdoor observation platform. In addition to the mileage fees paid to Amtrak to transport the train car across the United States, it costs $10,000 a month to staff, maintain, store, and insure the Patrón Tequila Express.

== Personal life ==
DeJoria has married four times. He married his current wife, Eloise Broady DeJoria, in 1993. They have one child, John Anthony. He also has three children from previous relationships, John Paul II (or Jr.), Alexis Jones (with former wife Jamie Briggs), and Michaeline. He also has two stepchildren from Eloise's previous relationship, Michael and Justin Harvey.

The DeJorias have contributed over $4,000 to the political campaigns of Senator Ted Cruz and over $5,000 to Texas Governor Rick Perry, among others, as well as to the Democratic National Committee and many Democratic political candidates. In 2025, John was among the top donors to the MAHA PAC, donating $50,000.

DeJoria is a supporter of Mobile Loaves & Fishes, Food4Africa, Mineseeker, and Blazer House. In 2008, DeJoria traveled to sub-Saharan Africa to join Nelson Mandela in his efforts to help feed over 17,000 orphaned children through Food4Africa. In the same year, his company Paul Mitchell helped provide over 400,000 life-saving meals for the children. Dejoria is a co-creator of Grow Appalachia, an organization begun in 2009 which helps promote healthy food and teaching farming skills.

In 2017, a documentary named Good Fortune depicted the struggle and philanthropic work of DeJoria; it won the Audience Award for Best Documentary at Sundance.

In 2012, using a video, he showed his support for Captain Paul Watson of the Sea Shepherd Conservation Society, when Watson was detained in Germany for interfering with shark finning operations. In December 2022, The Captain Paul Watson Foundation announced their first ship, the 'John Paul Dejoria II'.

In 2018, when DeJoria finalized the purchase of Taymouth Castle, he gave £10 million to his lawyer, Stephen Jones, for the transaction. Jones absconded with the funds, leaving DeJoria and his fellow investors to pay for the property a second time. Seeking restitution, DeJoria eventually got Jones's professional indemnity insurers, Axis Specialty, to pay him $7 million via a Court of Appeal order. Jones went to prison.

In 2019, he purchased the 80-acre (32 ha) campus that once housed McDonald's global headquarters. This acquisition includes the Hamburger University training facility and the Hyatt-branded and managed hotel The Hyatt Lodge.

In 2022, he pledged £20,000 to save the 19th-century frigate HMS Unicorn, one of the oldest surviving ships in the world.
