= Île Howe =

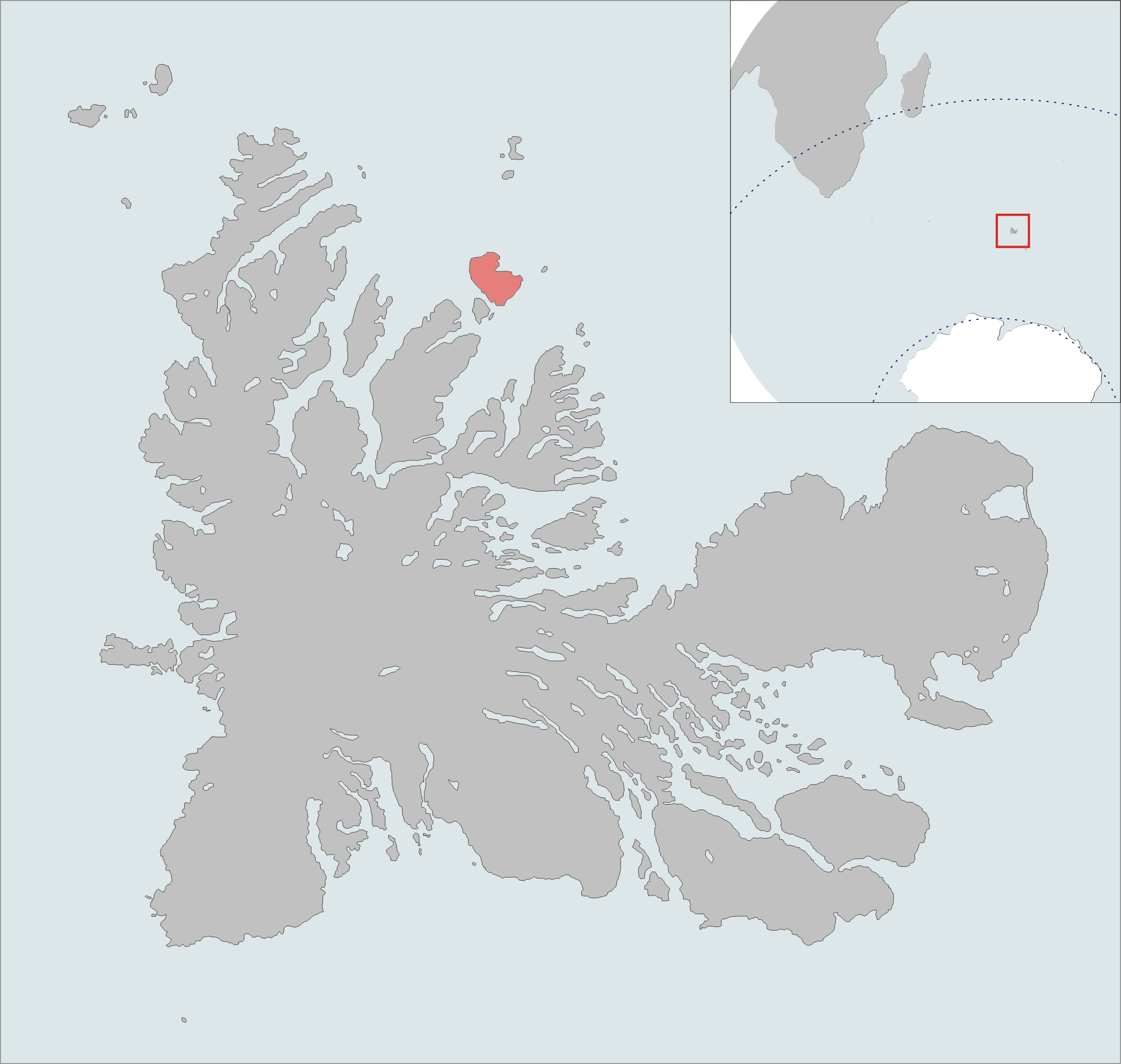
- L'île Howe is highlighted on this Kerguelen Islands map.
- Interactive map of Île Howe

Geography
- Location: Indian Ocean
- Coordinates: 48°51′32″S 69°26′31″E
- Archipelago: Îles Kerguelen
- Total islands: 1
- Major islands: Île Howe
- Area: 51.0 km^{2} (19.7 sq mi)
- Area rank: 4th(In the Kerguelen Islands
- Length: 8 km (5 mi)
- Width: 7 km (4.3 mi)
- Coastline: 28.5 km (17.71 mi)
- Highest elevation: 245 m (804 ft)
- Highest point: Mont des Moutons

Administration
- France
- District: Îles Kerguelen

Demographics
- Demonym: Howe
- Population: 0

Île Howe is one of the islands of the Kerguelen archipelago, situated to the north of Île Foch, just after Île MacMurdo. It is about 8 km in length. Apart from rabbits, it is free of introduced animals.

== Important Bird Area ==
The island, along with the neighbouring, and relatively large, islands of Île Foch and Île Saint-Lanne Gramont, as well as the smaller Île MacMurdo, Île Briand, Îles Dayman and Îlots Hallet, has been identified by BirdLife International as an Important Bird Area (IBA) because of its value as a breeding site, especially for seabirds, with at least 29 species nesting in the IBA.
