= Diana Lee =

American actress and model

Playboy centerfold appearance
- May 1988
- Preceded by: Eloise Broady
- Succeeded by: Emily Arth

Personal details
- Born: May 11, 1961 (age 65) Seattle, Washington
- Height: 5 ft 7 in (1.70 m)

Diana Lee (born May 11, 1961), otherwise known as Diana Lee-Hsu or Diane Hsu, is an American model and actress.

== Career ==
Lee was chosen as Playboy's Playmate of the Month for May 1988. Her centerfold was photographed by Stephen Wayda and Richard Fegley. As an actress, she performed in several Playboy videos and had an appearance in the 1989 James Bond movie Licence to Kill. In the film, Lee played Loti, a Hong Kong narcotic agent. She is also prominently featured in the film's title sequence.

== Filmography ==
- Licence to Kill (1989) – Loti
- Snapdragon (1993) – Professor Huan
- Totally Blonde (2001) – Translator
- Collar (2016) – Rebecca Allensworth

| Kimberley Conrad | Kari Kennell | Susie Owens | Eloise Broady | Diana Lee | Emily Arth |
| Terri Lynn Doss | Helle Michaelsen | Laura Richmond | Shannon Long | Pia Reyes | Kata Kärkkäinen |
