= Snapdragon (film) =

1993 American film

- DVD cover
- Directed by: Worth Keeter
- Written by: Gene Church; Terri Treas
- Starring: Steven Bauer; Chelsea Field; Pamela Anderson
- Cinematography: James Mathers
- Edited by: Gina Mittelman
- Music by: Michael Linn
- Release date: 1993
- Running time: 98 minutes
- Country: United States
- Language: English

Snapdragon is a 1993 film directed by Worth Keeter. It stars Pamela Anderson and was her first starring film role after the success of her Playboy layouts.

== Plot summary ==
When two men are killed after meeting up with an unknown prostitute, Sergeant Peckham is sent from vice squad to homicide to investigate. She has her boyfriend, police psychologist David Stratton, assist her in profiling the murderer. Soon they both become involved with Felicity, an amnesiac who keeps having a recurring nightmare where she kills her lovers. They both soon start to suspect that Felicity is connected to the murders they are investigating.

== Cast ==
- Steven Bauer as Dr. David 'Doc' Hoogstraten
- Chelsea Field as Detective Sergeant "Peck" Peckham
- Pamela Anderson as Felicity
- Matt McCoy as Bernie
- Kenneth Tigar as Captain
- Larry Manetti as Lengle
- Rance Howard as Priest
- Gloria LeRoy as Nurse (Credited as Gloria Le Roi)
- Drew Snyder as The Coroner
- Diana Lee Hsu as Professor Huan
- Irene Tsu as Hua
- Michael Monks as Grosky
- John F. O'Donohue as "Fat Man"
- Phillip Troy Linger as Mental Patient
