= Île Saint-Lanne Gramont =

Island in the Antarctic Kerguelen Islands

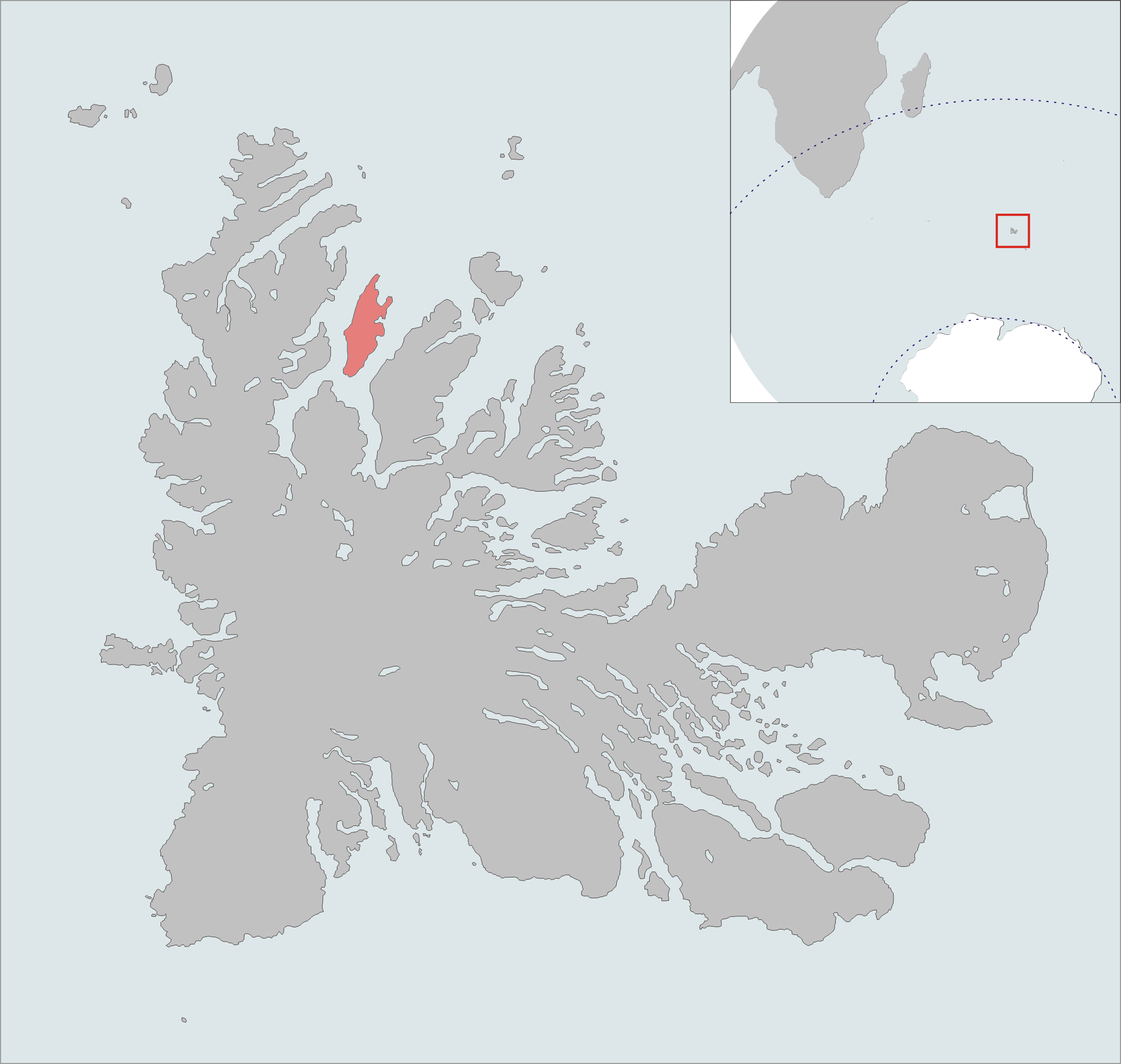
- Île Saint-Lanne Gramont on the Kerguelen Islands
- Interactive map of Île Saint-Lanne Gramont

Geography
- Location: Indian Ocean
- Coordinates: 48°55′32″S 69°10′46″E
- Archipelago: Îles Kerguelen
- Total islands: 1
- Major islands: Île Saint-Lanne Gramont
- Area: 45.8 km^{2} (17.7 sq mi)
- Area rank: 5th(In the Kerguelen Islands
- Length: 16 km (9.9 mi)
- Width: 6 km (3.7 mi)
- Coastline: 43.5 km (27.03 mi)
- Highest elevation: 473 m (1552 ft)
- Highest point: Mont Mac Cormick

Administration
- France
- District: Îles Kerguelen

Demographics
- Demonym: Saint-Lanne Gramonte
- Population: 0

Île Saint-Lanne Gramont (French pronunciation: [il sɛ̃ lan ɡʁamɔ̃]) is an uninhabited island, the fourth largest island in the Kerguelen Islands, situated to the north of Presqu'île de la Société de Géographie, with an area of 45.8 km^{2}. It reaches 480 m at its highest point and is located at 48°55′25″S 69°10′54″E. The island is elongated along a north–south axis, reaching a maximum length of 13 km and a maximum width of 3 km. It is free of introduced animals.

== Important Bird Area ==
The island, along with the neighbouring, and relatively large, islands of Île Foch and Île Howe, as well as the smaller Île MacMurdo, Île Briand, Îles Dayman and Îlots Hallet, has been identified by BirdLife International as an Important Bird Area (IBA) because of its value as a breeding site, especially for seabirds, with at least 29 species nesting in the IBA.
