= Reuven Bar-Yotam =

Israeli actor (died 2021)

Reuven Bar-Yotam (1935-8 February 2021) was an Israeli actor. Yotam was born in Haifa, residing in the Ramat Shaul neighborhood of the French Carmel in Haifa. Starting his acting career at age 13, he played in theaters in Israel, including the Haifa Theater.

In 1980, he immigrated to the United States to work in Hollywood. He had guest roles in American films such as "Lawyers Al. Ai", "You Don't Mess with the Zohan", "Shameless", and "Seinfeld".

He died on 8 February 2021, at the age of 85.
