= Maréchal Foch =

Maréchal Foch may refer to:

- Ferdinand Foch (1851–1929), French general, Marshal of France and Allied Supreme Commander in World War I
- Marechal Foch (grape), a red wine grape variety named for Ferdinand Foch
- Various streets and avenues - see List of streets named after Ferdinand Foch
