= Matthew Fosh =

English cricketer and rugby union player (born 1957)

Personal information
- Full name: Matthew Kailey Fosh
- Born: 26 September 1957 (age 69); Epping, Essex, England
- Batting: Left-handed
- Bowling: Right-arm medium
- Relatives: Max Fosh (son)

Domestic team information
- Years: Team
- 1976–1978: Essex

Career statistics
Competition	First-class	List A
Matches	30	16
Runs scored	1,069	307
Batting average	23.23	21.92
100s/50s	1/6	0/0
Top score	109	45
Catches/stumpings	9/–	2/–
- Source: Cricinfo, 6 October 2024

Matthew Kailey Fosh (born 26 September 1957) is an English former first-class cricketer who played 30 games for Cambridge University, Combined Universities and Essex between 1976 and 1978. A left-handed batsman tipped for high honours in his youth, Fosh decided against taking up a career in the county game. Following his career in cricket, Fosh became a financier in the City of London. He is also the father of the YouTuber and comedian Max Fosh.

== Early life and education ==
Matthew Kailey Fosh was born on 26 September 1957, the son of Arthur Fosh, of Egg Hall, Epping, Essex, an Old Harrovian who also studied at Pembroke College, Cambridge and was owner of lithographic printing company Fosh & Cross, on Mansell Street, on the edge of the City of London. Fosh was educated at Harrow School, where he played in a band called Toyd, two members of which later found success in the 1980s as Red Box. Fosh is a trustee of the Harrow Development Trust, dedicated to improving the school including through financial donations.

He then went up to Magdalene College, Cambridge, where he took a BA in 1979.

== Cricket and rugby ==
Fosh played cricket at school, including as captain; in 2017, he still held "the highest score since the First World War... 161 not out" in the Eton v Harrow match, which was first played in 1805. His son, Max, also played cricket for Harrow.

He got a double blue at Cambridge for cricket and rugby union. Fosh scored 1069 runs at 23.33 with one century, 109 for Cambridge against Derbyshire, and six fifties. In 14 list A one-day matches he scored 307 runs at 21.92 with a best of 45. He toured the West Indies with the England Young Cricketers in 1976 and played in one 'test match' in Trinidad alongside Mike Gatting and David Gower, scoring 41 in the first innings of a game won by England by 22 runs.

He represented Cambridge at rugby union in the 1978 and 1979 Varsity Matches.

== Business career ==
After Cambridge, Fosh travelled for 18 months, then went to work in London in financial public relations and private client fund management for stockbrokers Strauss Turnbull and Carr Sheppards. He founded futures and options broker SGF with a school friend, selling it in 2000 for a seven-figure sum; he left in 2002 and went to work at Lloyd's insurer SVB Holdings, where he became chief executive. He was chief executive officer at Novae Group from 2002 to 2017. In 2020, he joined Optio Group as an executive chairman.

== Personal life ==
Fosh was married to Dutch advertising and financial public relations executive Helena, daughter of diplomat Joost van der Kun and his wife Adrienne, daughter of Jonkheer Thomas Theodore Flugi van Aspermont, vice-consul at Marseille. The couple have two children: daughter Talitha "Tally", and son Maximilian, a YouTuber and independent candidate in the 2021 London mayoral election. Helena Fosh subsequently married Sir John Auld Mactaggart, 4th Baronet.
