= Île Foch =

One of the Kerguelen Islands

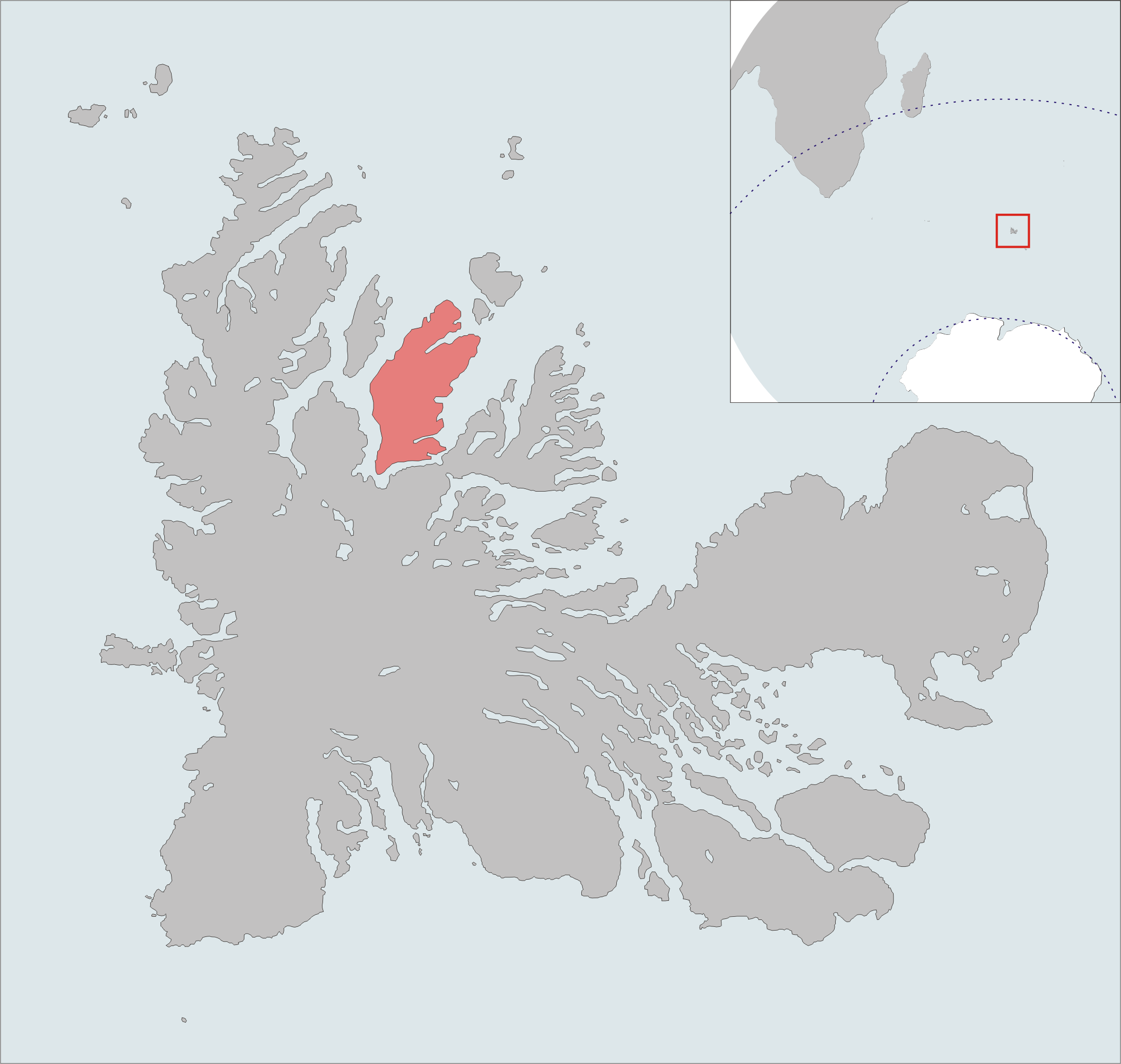
- The Île Foch is highlighted on this Kerguelen Islands map.
- Interactive map of Île Foch

Geography
- Location: Indian Ocean
- Coordinates: 48°59′39″S 69°16′42″E
- Archipelago: Îles Kerguelen
- Total islands: 1
- Major islands: Île Foch
- Area: 206.0 km^{2} (79.5 sq mi)
- Area rank: 2nd (In the Kerguelen Islands)
- Length: 27.9 km (17.34 mi)
- Width: 12.2 km (7.58 mi)
- Coastline: 107 km (66.5 mi)
- Highest elevation: 687 m (2254 ft)
- Highest point: Pyramide mexicaine

Administration
- France
- District: Îles Kerguelen

Demographics
- Demonym: Fochen
- Population: 0

Île Foch (French pronunciation: [il fɔʃ]) is one of the Kerguelen Islands situated near to the north coast of Grande Terre, the principal island.

It is separated from this main island by a narrow sea arm, the Tucker strait. It borders Île Saint-Lanne Gramont at the northwest, which is separated by the Baie de Londres. At the northeast point it borders Mac Murdo and Howe island.

With an area of 206 square kilometres (51,000 acres), it is the second-largest island in the archipelago. Its highest point, which has an elevation of 687 metres (2,254 ft), is named la Pyramide mexicaine, 'the Mexican Pyramid'.

== Protected area ==
Since it is the largest island in the archipelago with no introduced species (no rabbits, cats, mice or rats), Île Foch is used as a reference as to the original ecosystem of Kerguelen Island. To prevent any accidental introduction of species, access is highly regulated and restricted to scientific missions only.

=== Important Bird Area ===
The island, along with the neighbouring, and relatively large, islands of Île Saint-Lanne Gramont and Île Howe, as well as the smaller Île Mac Murdo, Île Briand, Îles Dayman and Îlots Hallet, have been identified by BirdLife International as an Important Bird Area (IBA) because of its value as a breeding site, especially for seabirds, with at least 29 species nesting in the IBA.
