= Max Fosh =

English YouTuber (born 1995)

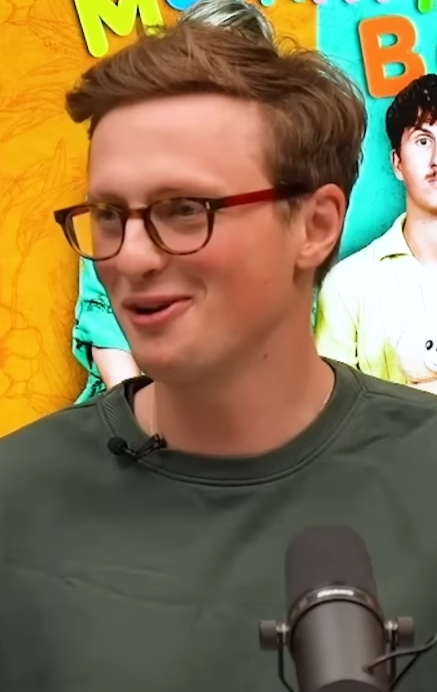
- Fosh in 2024
- Born: Maximilian Arthur Fosh; 3 April 1995 (age 31); Lambeth, London, England
- Education: Newcastle University (BA)
- Occupations: YouTuber; comedian
- Father: Matthew Fosh

YouTube information
- Channel: Max Fosh
- Years active: 2017–present
- Subscribers: 5.17 million
- Views: 1.94 billion
- Last updated: 19 October 2026
- Website: maxfosh.co

Maximilian Arthur Fosh (born 3 April 1995) is an English YouTuber and comedian. As of April 2026, his YouTube channel has over 5 million subscribers.

== Early life ==
Maximilian Arthur Fosh was born on 3 April 1995 at St Thomas' Hospital in London, England, to father Matthew Fosh, an English cricketer and rugby union player, and mother Helena. He has a sister, Talitha. He attended Arnold House School in Westminster, London before progressing to Harrow School from 2008 until 2013.

Fosh later attended Newcastle University and graduated with a bachelor's degree.

== Career ==
=== Radio ===
While studying at Newcastle University, Fosh began presenting at Radio Tyneside. When at Radio Tyneside, he won gold in the "Best Newcomer" category at the National Hospital Radio Awards in 2017.

On Christmas Day in 2022, Fosh presented a half-hour "TikTok Takeover" show on BBC Radio 1, following an event almost two years earlier which involved printing his CV in large text on the roof of a car, and parking it outside of Broadcasting House in London.

Fosh is set to host new BBC Radio 4 quiz Your Number's Up, with two pilot episodes airing in summer 2026.

=== YouTube ===
Fosh's YouTube channel has amassed more than 5 million subscribers, and includes "silly" pranks and jokes – as well as other comedic content. The channel was started on 13 January 2016 and posted its inaugural video on 18 October 2017, which started a series called "StreetSmart" (the channel's name at the time) where Fosh would interview people on the streets.

In May 2022, Fosh placed a large sign reading "Welcome to Luton", visible from the approach path for Gatwick Airport, to trick arriving travellers into thinking they were instead at Luton Airport, triggering reactions from local news and social media. Being noticed by the media, Fosh made several appearances on TV and radio, although some people criticised the prank as having caused undue stress for arriving passengers. Fosh had use of the land on which the sign was placed for six weeks, and said that renting the land and materials for the sign cost more than £4000.

In 2025, Fosh obtained a symbolic death certificate from the unrecognised micronation Principality of Seborga as part of a satirical video project intended to test whether such documentation could be used to obtain a refund for a ticket from an airline. The video, which was uploaded on 30 June, documented his visit with Seborga's head of state, a staged funeral, and the submission of the certificate to the airline. Although the airline began reviewing the refund request, Fosh ultimately discontinued the process after receiving legal advice against pursuing the claim further.

In September 2025, Fosh, in a bathtub, sailed across the Celtic Sea, from Cornwall to the Isles of Scilly. The idea had been based on a drawing he had made at the age of six; it was of him "in a bath tub sailing the seas." He had set sail from Sennen Cove, Cornwall at 7:30 BST and arrived in Hugh Town 9 hours later at 16:00 BST. Prior to the voyage, he had titled the boat, Billy the Bathtub Boat; then, upon arrival at Hugh Town, he gifted it to a 10-year-old. Later that year, he would upload a 2-part YouTube video on it; part one on December 11, then part two on December 14.

=== Stand-up comedy ===
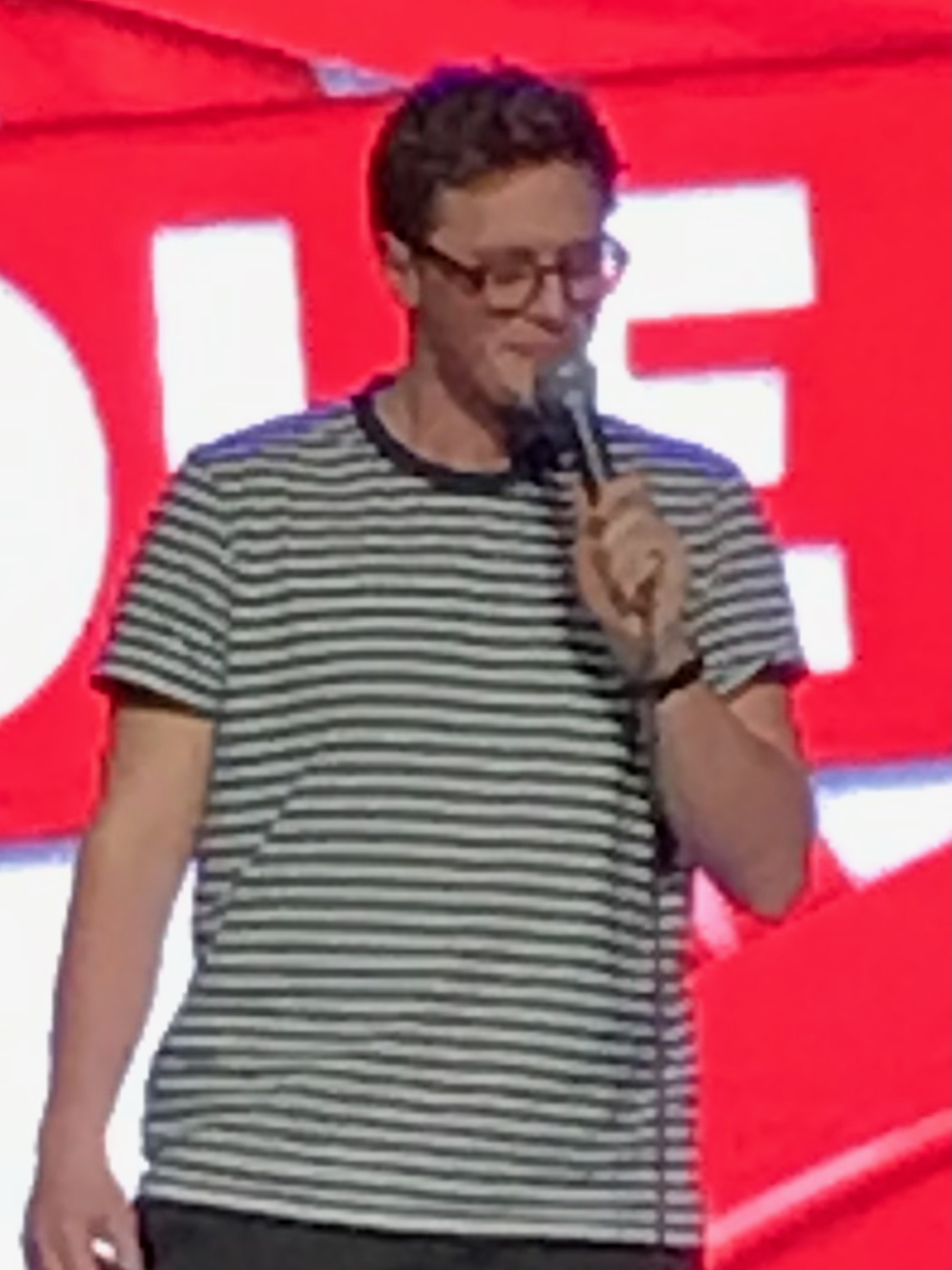
Fosh performing Loophole at Palladium Times Square in New York on November 9, 2024

Following his YouTube success, in 2021 Fosh toured the UK with his show "Zocial Butterfly", which he had originally written in 2019. He then went on to take the show to the Edinburgh Fringe in August 2022, his debut at the festival. Isobel Lewis of The Independent rated the performance two out of five stars, said he was "promising" despite lacking the "comedy chops needed for a Fringe show."

In September 2024, Fosh debuted his show, Loophole, at the Cambridge Corn Exchange. In it, Fosh is shown attempting to find loopholes and then exploiting them. He has described the shows as, "YouTube video but on stage." Loophole has toured internationally in places such as the U.S. in November 2024, Scandinavia in November and December 2024, and Australia in March 2025.

=== Other ===
On 9 September 2023, Fosh played for the YouTube Allstars in the Sidemen Charity Match. He also took part in the 2025 and 2026 match. He created a running gag where in each match, he got booked with a yellow card by referee Mark Clattenburg, then destroyed the card. In the 2023 match, he refused the card by showing Clattenburg an Uno reverse card. In the 2025 match, Fosh shredded the card with a portable shredder. In the 2026 match, Fosh burned the card in a magic trick.

== 2021 London mayoral candidacy ==
Fosh was an independent candidate in the 2021 London mayoral election, which was won by the incumbent, Sadiq Khan. Fosh said he ran simply to "wind up" fellow former Harrovian Laurence Fox, who was running as a right-wing candidate for the Reclaim Party, which Fox had recently founded. Fosh aimed to get more votes than Fox, but failed to do so, coming second from last. Fosh also said he wanted to increase youth turnout. Fosh put forward a set of comedic policies and said, "I would make a terrible mayor".

Mayor of London election 6 May 2021
Party	Candidate	1st round		2nd round			1st round votesTransfer votes, 2nd round
Party	Candidate	Total	Of round	Transfers	Total	Of round	1st round votesTransfer votes, 2nd round
Labour	Sadiq Khan	1,013,721	40.0%	192,313	1,206,034	55.2%	
Conservative	Shaun Bailey	893,051	35.3%	84,550	977,601	44.8%	
Green	Siân Berry	197,976	7.8%				
Liberal Democrats	Luisa Porritt	111,716	4.4%				
Independent	Niko Omilana	49,628	2.0%				
Reclaim	Laurence Fox	47,634	1.9%				
London Real	Brian Rose	31,111	1.2%				
Rejoin EU	Richard Hewison	28,012	1.1%				
Count Binface	Count Binface	24,775	1.0%				
Women's Equality	Mandu Reid	21,182	0.8%				
Let London Live	Piers Corbyn	20,604	0.8%				
Animal Welfare	Vanessa Hudson	16,826	0.7%				
UKIP	Peter Gammons	14,393	0.6%				
Independent	Farah London	11,869	0.5%				
Heritage	David Kurten	11,025	0.4%				
Independent	Nims Obunge	9,682	0.4%				
SDP	Steve Kelleher	8,764	0.3%				
Renew	Kam Balayev	7,774	0.3%				
Independent	Max Fosh	6,309	0.2%				
Burning Pink	Valerie Brown	5,305	0.2%				
Labour hold							

== Filmography ==
Year	Title	Role	Notes	Ref
2025	Inside: USA	Contestant	Reoccurring	
2026	Would You Rather: Decide to Survive	Season 1 Contestant	Reoccurring	
2026	Do You Know Your Place?	Season 1 Contestant	Week 4	

== Awards and nominations ==
Awards for radio presenting
Award ceremony	Year	Category	Result	Ref.
National Hospital Radio Awards	2017	Best Newcomer	Won	
National Hospital Radio Awards	2018	Best Male Presenter	Nominated	
