= AXIS Capital =

Bermuda-based and global operating reinsurer

AXIS Capital Holdings Limited
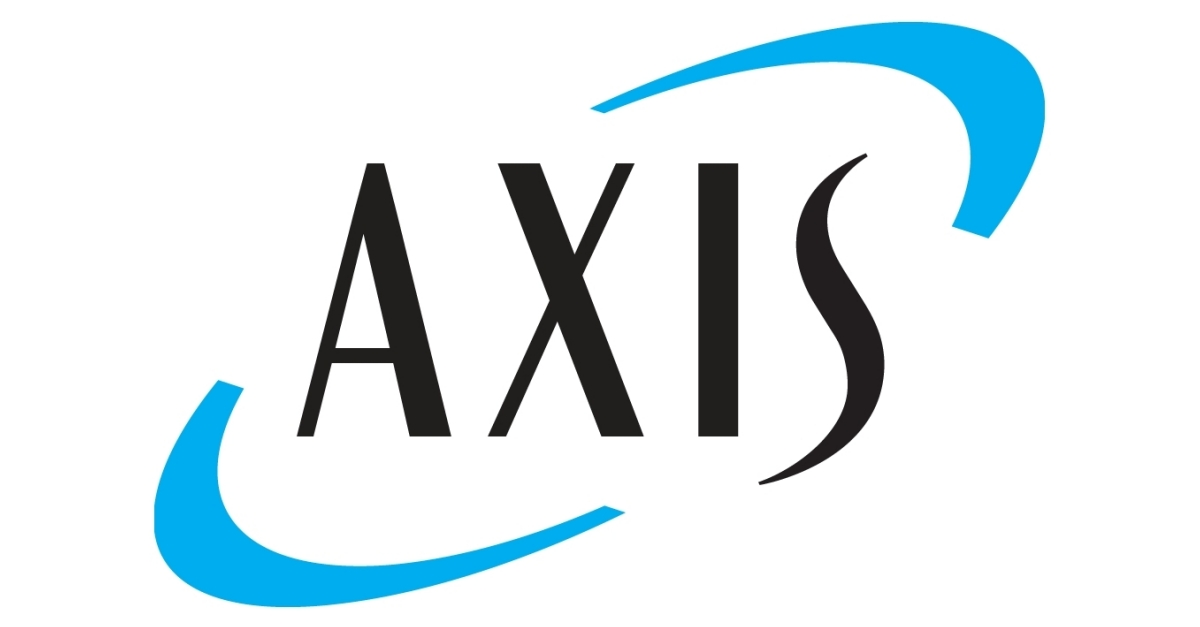
- Type: Public
- Traded as: NYSE: AXS; Russell 1000 Component
- Industry: Property & casualty insurance
- Founded: 2001 (25 years old)
- Headquarters: Bermuda
- Key people: Vince Tizzio (CEO)
- Revenue: ▲US$ 6,564 million (2025)
- Net income: ▼US$ 1,009 million (2025)
- Website: www.axiscapital.com

AXIS Capital Holdings Limited is the holding company for AXIS group of companies. It offers various risk transfer products and services through subsidiaries and branch networks in Bermuda, the United States, Canada, Europe and Singapore. The company offers insurance services including property, professional lines, terrorism, marine, energy, environmental and other insurance. The reinsurance services include property, professional lines, credit and bond, and others.

== History ==
AXIS Capital Holdings Limited was founded in Pembroke, Bermuda in 2001.

In February 2004, the company formed a healthcare unit providing professional liability insurance.

In June 2015, AXIS and PartnerRe Ltd started a public campaign to convince shareholders of the positive aspects of a potential $13 billion merger between the two companies, with competition seen from Exor SpA, which bid $6.8 billion.

In 2017 AXIS Capital has completed its acquisition of Novae Group P.L.C and Aviabel S.A.

In February 2020, AXIS Capital Holdings chairman of the board and co-founder Michael Butt announced his retirement after five decades in the insurance business. AXIS board member and lead independent director Henry B. Smith has been appointed as successor to the chairmanship post.

In May 2023, Vincent Tizzio was appointed President and CEO of AXIS, succeeding Albert Benchimol.

== Offices ==
AXIS Capital has office locations in Bermuda, the United States, Europe, Singapore and Canada.

== Managers ==
- President & CEO - Vincent C. Tizzio
