= YouCam Makeup =

Photo editing application

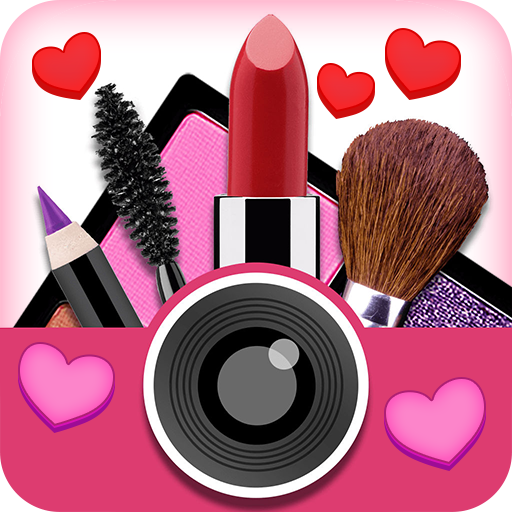
- Developer: Perfect Corp
- Initial release: 2014
- Operating system: iOS, Android
- Type: Augmented reality, virtual makeover, selfie editing
- License: Freemium
- Website: www.perfectcorp.com/consumer/apps/ymk

YouCam Makeup is a mobile app for augmented reality (AR) makeup simulation and selfie editing developed by Perfect Corp. It offers virtual try-ons for cosmetics alongside photo and video editing tools, and is available for iOS and Android. It has been downloaded over 1 billion times as of October 2025.

== History ==
YouCam Makeup was launched in 2014 by Perfect Corp, a company specializing in artificial intelligence and augmented reality applications for beauty and fashion, and gained popularity due to its AR and AI technologies, which provided realistic and customizable makeup simulations.

YouCam Makeup operates on a freemium model, offering basic features for free, while more advanced tools and effects are available through in-app purchases or subscriptions. The app also generates revenue through partnerships with cosmetic brands for virtual makeup try-ons. Its virtual try-on feature has been incorporated by beauty brands and retailers for digital product visualization for consumers. The app is available for iOS and Android devices.

Since 2016, YouCam Makeup has partnered with various beauty brands and media outlets to expand its functionalities. Collaborations include partnerships with Ardell, Laura Geller, Elizabeth Arden, and Glamour. In 2017, YouCam Makeup expanded its partnerships to include movie and TV shopping collaborations with Paramount Pictures and QVC.

In 2018, the app was named "One of the Best" at CES BeautyTech and won the CEW Best Beauty App Award. The same year, YouCam Makeup partnered with Cosmopolitan magazine for the first print-to-digital virtual beauty service, allowing readers to try virtual makeup looks via their mobile devices.

In 2019, the app was honored at the 32nd Edison Awards and CEW's Beauty Awards.

In 2022, the app collaborated with Paramount Pictures on the interactive Top Gun: Maverick movie experience and supported breast cancer awareness by sponsoring Pink Agenda events in May, June, and October.

== Features ==
YouCam Makeup can perform tasks of:

Virtual try-on:

- AR makeup: AR-powered application of virtual makeup looks with customizable lipsticks, eyeshadows, blushes, eyeliners, and more;
- AR accessories: Augmented reality feature enabling the application of virtual accessories, including glasses, hats, earrings, and other accessories;
- AR effects: Integration of dynamic visual elements and background modifications.

Beauty tools:

- Skin smoothing: adjustment of skin texture to remove blemishes, smooth wrinkles, and even out skin tone;
- Face reshaping: modification of facial proportions, including sliming face, enlarging eyes, reshaping nose, and adjusting other facial features;
- Body tuning: proportional alterations to body shape;
- Teeth whitening;
- Eye & lip enhancement: enhances eye color, removes red-eye, and adds sparkle.

Hairstyles:

- AI hairstyle: Simulation of various hairstyle options;
- Hair coloring: Visualization of different hair colors and shades.

Photo editing:

- Photo makeup: digital application of makeup effects including lipstick, eyeshadow, blush, and more in photo editing mode;
- Effects: application of photo effects with different styles and moods;
- Editing tools: Functions for cropping, resizing, rotating, adjusting brightness, contrast, saturation, sharpness;
- AI removal: automatically removes unwanted objects from photos;
- AI background: Modification of photo background, making transparent background, or changing the background color and image;

Generative AI tools

- AI fashion: Visualization of virtual clothing and accessories;
- AI avatar: Creation of personalized avatars with customizable features;
- AI headshot: Generation of professional-quality headshots using AI technology;
- AI studio: A creative space for visual effects and enhancements;
- AI aging: Age progression simulation through AI-based algorithms.
