= Perfect Corp =

American SaaS artificial intelligence

Perfect Corp.
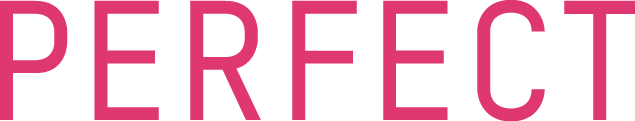
- Type: Public
- Traded as: NYSE: PERF
- Industry: Saas, AI, AR
- Founded: June 1, 2015
- Founder: Alice Chang
- Headquarters: New Taipei City, Xindian District, Taiwan
- Area served: Worldwide
- Products: AI and AR beauty technological products, YouCam Perfect, YouCam Makeup
- Services: SaaS, AI, AR beauty and fashion tech services
- Revenue: ▲US$69.2 million (2025)
- Net income: ▼US$4.64 million (2025)
- Number of employees: 342 (2023)
- Website: www.perfectcorp.com

Perfect Corp is a global SaaS artificial intelligence and augmented reality company. It is headquartered in New York. The company provides SaaS AI, AR beauty and fashion tech services. It is listed on New York Stock Exchange with trade symbol (PERF).

Perfect Corp has created an AI beauty assistant for the virtual world.

Their technologies are used by brands including Bobbi Brown, Estee Lauder, Madison Reed, and Ardell.

== History ==
Founded by Alice Chang in 2015, Perfect Corp was the first company to develop makeup virtual try-on with real-time camera support powered by machine learning. In 2020, Perfect Corp partnered with Google to launch a virtual try-on feature in Google shopping. It also partnered with Snapchat for Shoppable AR beauty try-on.

In 2024, Perfect Corp. reported a 12.5% year-over-year revenue increase, reaching $60.2 million, with net income at $5 million and adjusted net income rising 18.6% to $8.3 million.

In September 2024, RéVive Skincare partnered with Perfect Corp. to harness AI technology, utilizing data from RéVive's clinical trials to create interactive before-and-after visuals.

In November 2024, Perfect Corp. partnered with French skincare brand Holidermie to integrate its AI-powered Skincare Pro technology into Holidermie's flagship retail locations in Paris.

In December 2024, Perfect Corp. launched a suite of AI APIs designed to simplify the integration of advanced AI-powered beauty technology into various products and applications. These APIs offer features such as virtual hairstyles and wig try-ons, AI makeup transfer, age-progression simulations, text-to-image generation, and AI image enhancement tools.

At the same time, Perfect Corp. announced its acquisition of Wannaby Inc., a company specializing in augmented reality (AR) and computer vision technologies.

In January 2025, Perfect Corp. introduced the AI Frizzy Hair Analyzer, an addition to its AI Hair Analysis suite, designed to assess hair frizz levels using artificial intelligence.

In February 2025, Perfect Corp. collaborated with Inovshop Group to integrate its AI Skin Analysis tool, Skincare Pro, into Amazon's inaugural parapharmacy in Milan, Italy. This initiative features self-service mirrors equipped with iPads, enabling customers to receive personalized skin consultations by analyzing 15 unique skin concerns.

Also, in February, Skinworx, a skincare and aesthetic treatment provider, integrated Perfect Corp.'s Skincare Pro AI software at its medspa in Walnut Creek, California.

In July 2026, Perfect Corp. agreed to merge with ProjectNY, a company owned by founder and CEO Alice Chang, to become a privately held company. The transaction, valued at $2.00 per share, is expected to close in the fourth quarter of 2026.
