= Marc Fosh =

British chef

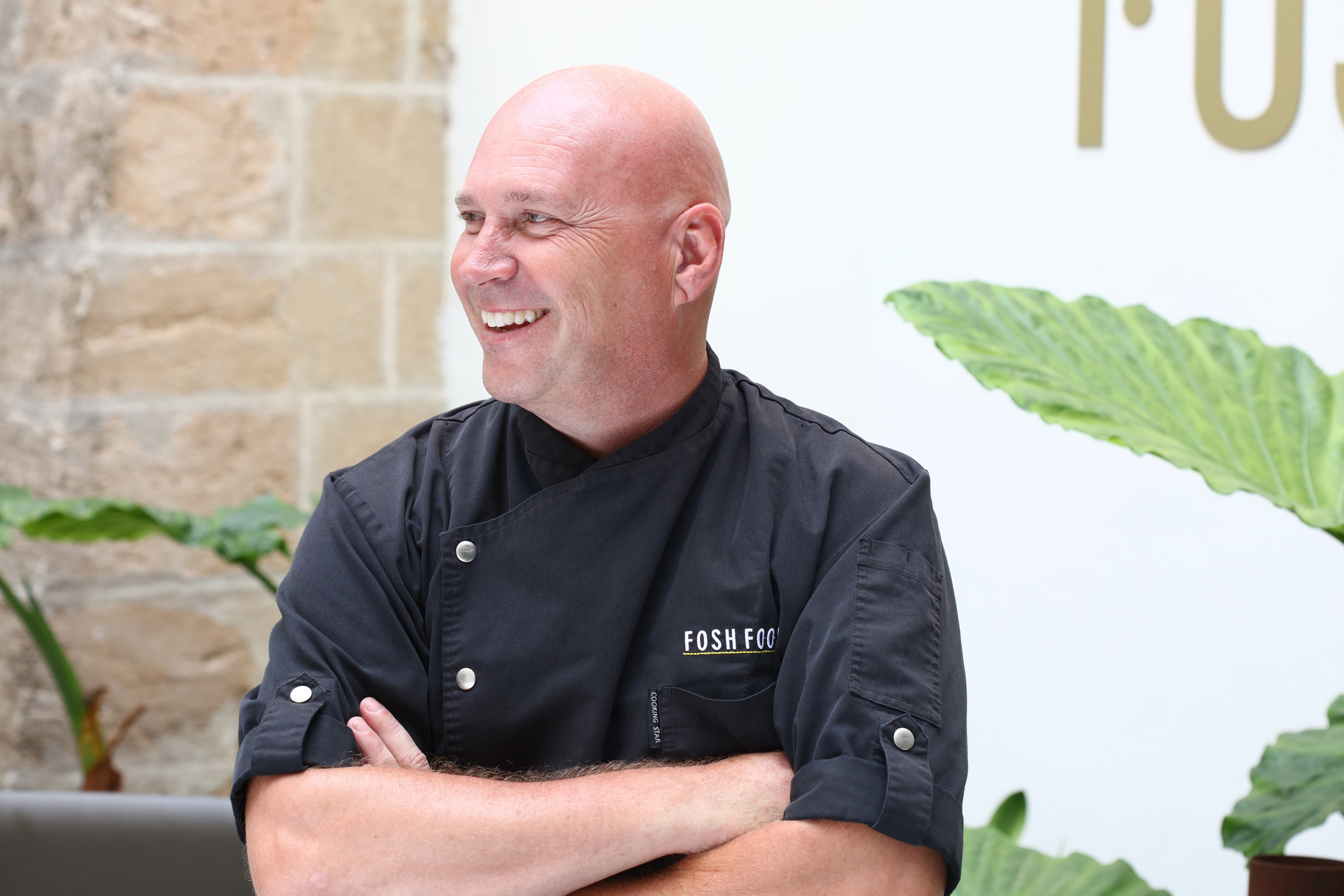
Fosh in 2016

Marc Fosh (born 14 August 1963) is a British chef who has lived and worked in Spain for over twenty years and is now based in Palma de Mallorca. His eponymous restaurant, Marc Fosh, gained a Michelin star in 2002. The restaurant is located in the hotel Convent de la Missio in Palma. The restaurant opened to positive reviews and has become one of Palma’s premiere culinary destinations.

In 2019 Fosh published a cookery book entitled Modern Mediterranean: Sun-drenched recipes from Mallorca and beyond.

== Publications ==
- Fosh, Marc. Modern Mediterranean: Sun-drenched recipes from Mallorca and beyond(2019)
