= Novae Group =

Insurance underwriting company

Novae
- Industry: insurance
- Founded: 1986; 40 years ago in London, United Kingdom
- Defunct: July 2017
- Successor: AXIS Capital
- Key people: John Hastings-Bass (chairman); Matthew Fosh (CEO)
- Owner: AXIS Capital

Novae Group Ltd was an insurance underwriting company headquartered in London.

== History ==
Novae Group was founded in 1986 as SVB Holdings plc. It specialised in the insurance of property, casualty and marine, aviation and political risks and was the subject of an initial public offering on the London Stock Exchange in 1998. It changed its name to Novae Group plc in 2006.

In July 2017, the company was acquired by AXIS Capital for $604 million.
