= John Paul Mitchell Systems =

American company

- Type: Private
- Industry: Cosmetology
- Founded: Hawaii, U.S. 1980
- Headquarters: Wilmer, Texas, U.S.
- Area served: Worldwide
- Key people: Michaeline DeJoria (CEO); John Paul DeJoria (CEO, co-founder); Paul Mitchell (Co-founder); Luke Jacobellis (President)
- Revenue: ▲$1 billion (2015)
- Number of employees: 183
- Website: www.paulmitchell.com

John Paul Mitchell Systems (JPMS) is an American manufacturer of hair care products and styling tools through several brands including Paul Mitchell, Tea Tree, Neuro, Pro Tools, Awapuhi Wild Ginger, MITCH, MVRCK, and Professional Hair Color.

== History ==
John Paul Mitchell Systems was founded in 1980 by John Paul DeJoria and Paul Mitchell. The company was formerly located in Beverly Hills, California; its world headquarters is now in Wilmer, Texas, with its operations facility in Santa Clarita, California. The company also operates its Paul Mitchell Schools, with 100 locations throughout the United States.

JPMS claims that their Tea Tree line is carbon neutral because they plant trees to offset carbon emissions.

In 2016, JPMS partnered with YouCam Makeup to create an app that allowed people to virtually experiment with their hair color.

As of 2018, JPMS sold more than 80 products. JPMS was the first professional hair care company to publicly oppose animal testing, and remains privately owned and independent.

In January 2018, JPMS announced a partnership with PS Salon & Spa.
