= Avenue Foch =

Street in Paris, France

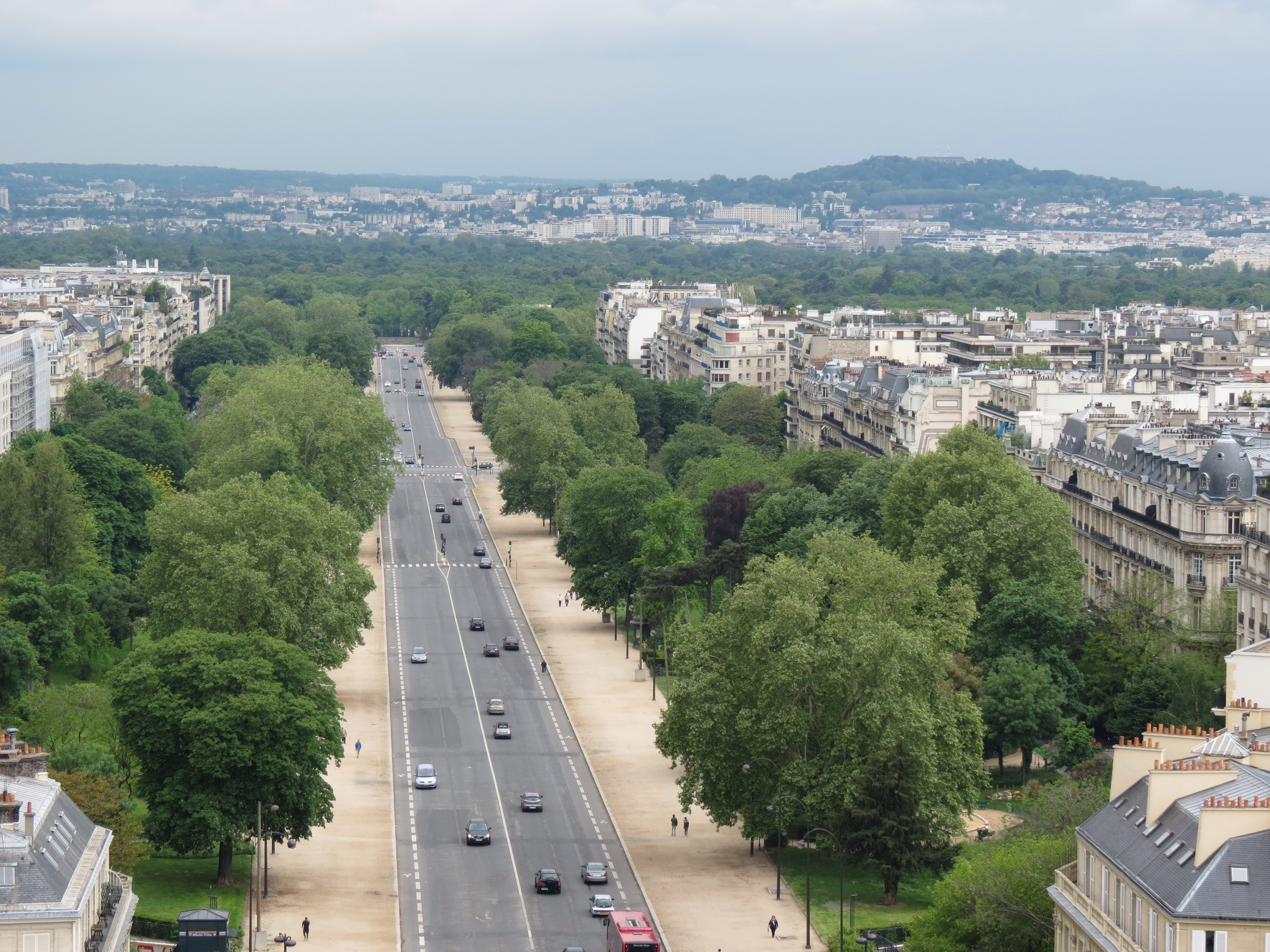
- Avenue Foch seen from the Arc de Triomphe

- Location within Paris
- Length: 1,300 m (4,300 ft)
- Width: 120 m (390 ft) in the section surrounded by gardens; 40 m elsewhere
- Arrondissement: 16th
- Quarter: Chaillot, Porte Dauphine
- Coordinates: 48°52′25″N 2°17′19″E
- From: Place Charles de Gaulle
- To: Boulevard Lannes and Place du Maréchal de Lattre de Tassigny

Construction
- Completion: 31 March 1854
- Denomination: 29 March 1929

The Avenue Foch (French pronunciation: [avny fɔʃ]) is an avenue in the 16th arrondissement of Paris, France, named after World War I Marshal Ferdinand Foch in 1929. It was previously known as the Avenue du Bois de Boulogne. It is one of the most prestigious streets in Paris, as well as one of the most expensive addresses in the world, home to many grand city palaces, including ones belonging to the Onassis and Rothschild families. The Rothschilds once owned numbers 19–21.

The avenue runs from the Arc de Triomphe southwest to the Porte Dauphine at the edge of the Bois de Boulogne city park. It is the widest avenue in Paris, lined with chestnut trees along its full length.

== History ==
The avenue was constructed during the reign of Emperor Napoleon III, as part of the grand plan for the reconstruction of Paris conducted by Napoleon's prefect of the Seine, Baron Haussmann. It was designed to connect the Place de l'Étoile with another important part of Haussmann's plan, the Bois de Boulogne, the new public park on the west end of the city. The original plan, by Jacques Hittorff, who had designed the Place de la Concorde decades earlier, called for an avenue forty metres wide between the modern Avenue Victor Hugo and the modern Avenue de la Grande Armée. Haussmann scrapped this plan and instead called for an avenue at least one hundred metres wide, wider than the Champs-Élysées between the Arc de Triomphe and the new Bois de Boulogne. Its purpose was to provide an impressive grand approach for fashionable Parisians to promenade from the centre of the city to the park in their carriages, to see and be seen. It was to be called the Avenue de l'Impératrice ("Avenue of the Empress"), for the Empress Eugenie, the wife of Napoleon III.

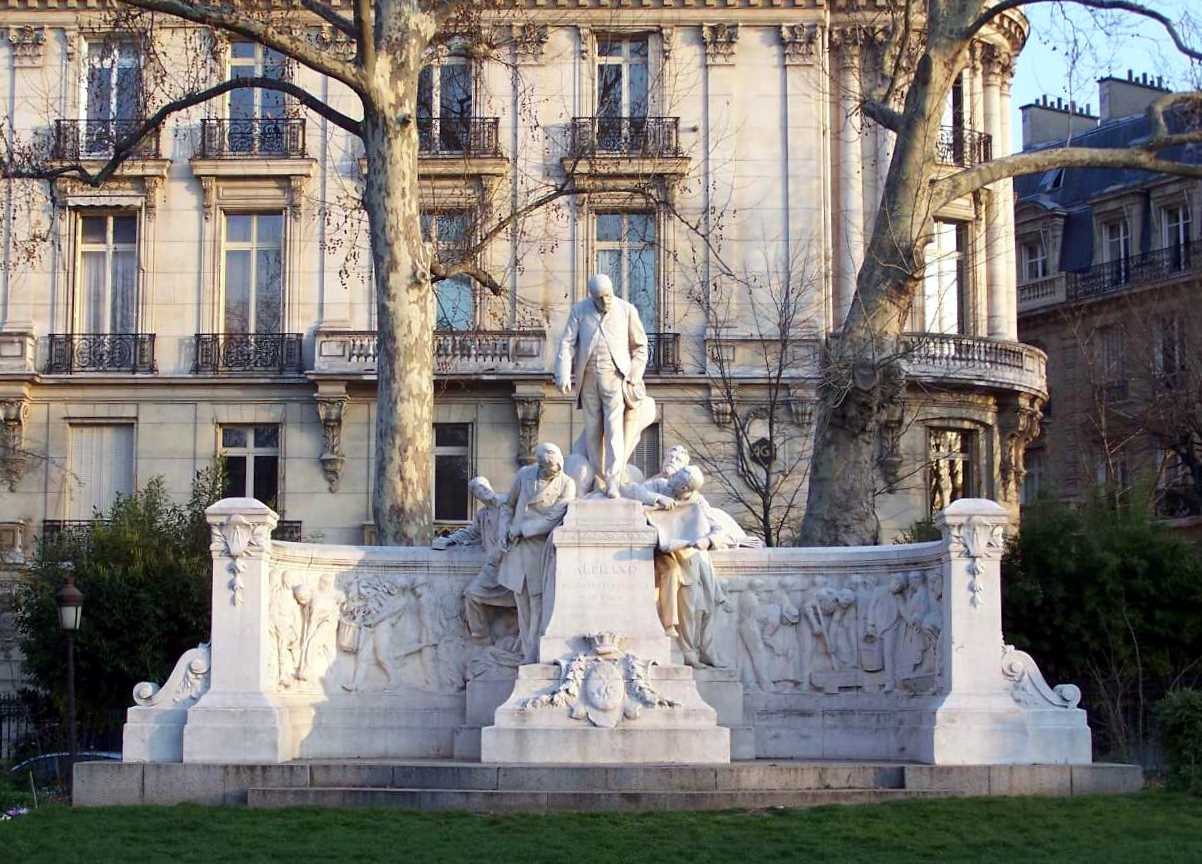
Memorial to Alphand by Jules Dalou

The avenue was built by Jean-Charles Adolphe Alphand, the chief engineer of the Service of Promenades and Plantations of Paris, who also designed the Bois de Boulogne, Bois de Vincennes, Parc Monceau, Parc des Buttes Chaumont, in addition to other parks and squares built by Napoleon III. The iron fences and lamps were designed by the architect Gabriel Davioud, who designed all the distinctive ornamental park architecture of Paris during the period, from fountains and temples to gates and fences. The final design consisted of a central avenue 120 metres wide and 1,300 metres long, flanked by sidewalks for pedestrians, riding paths for horsemen, in addition to crisscrossing alleys, shaded by rows of chestnut trees and decorated along its full length by ornamental lawns and gardens with exotic flowers and plants. It was, in fact, an extension of the Bois de Boulogne into the city, connecting directly with the avenues and paths of the park.

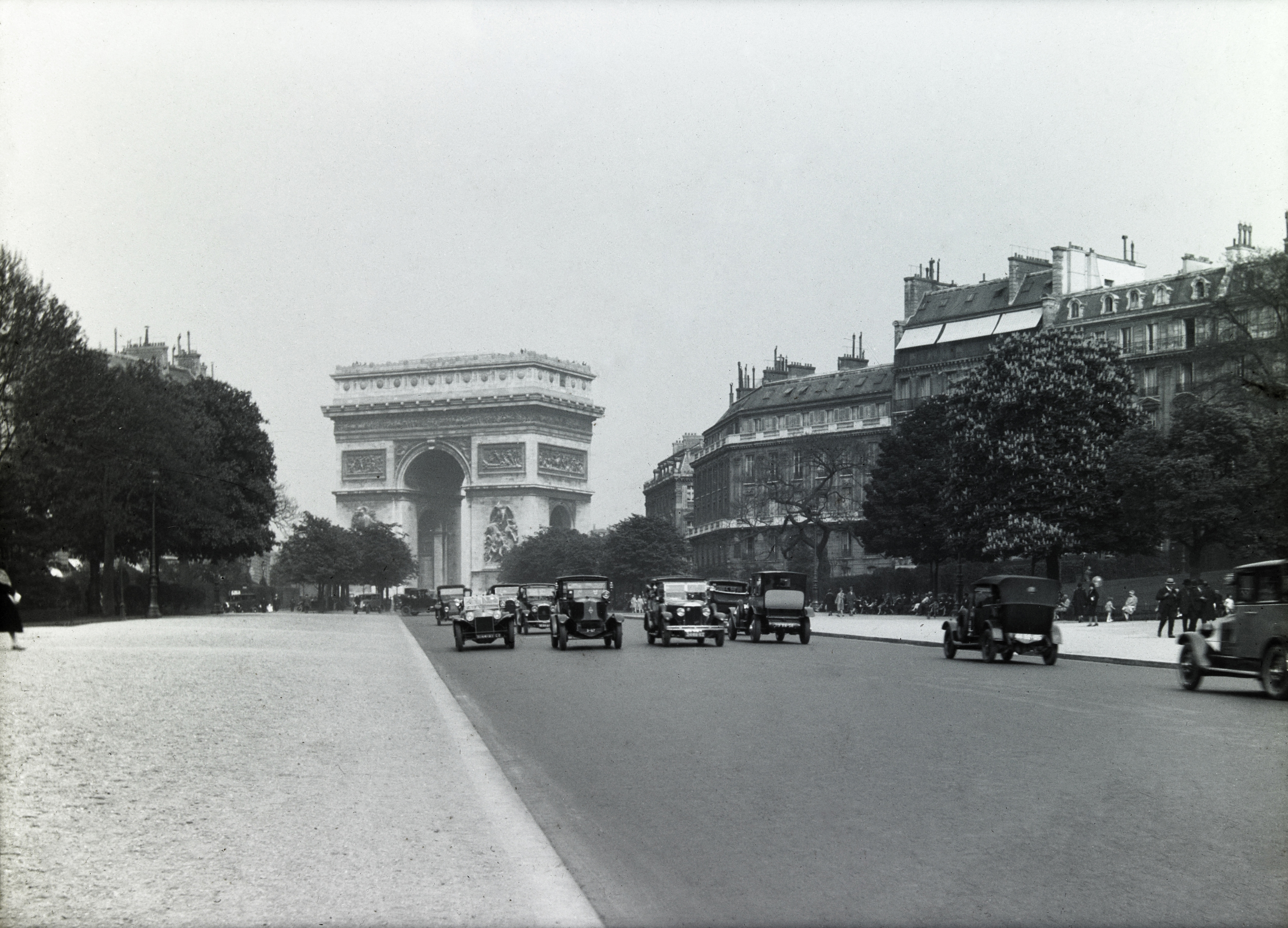
The Avenue c. 1920–1935

It opened in 1854 and was immediately popular with Parisians, although it did not keep its name for long. After the downfall of Napoleon III in 1870 and the establishment of the Third Republic, the name was changed from the Avenue de l'Impératrice to the Avenue du Général-Uhrich (after Jean-Jacques Uhrich), then again in 1875 to the Avenue du Bois de Boulogne. It was changed again in 1929 to the Avenue Foch, after the hero of the First World War, who died in that year.

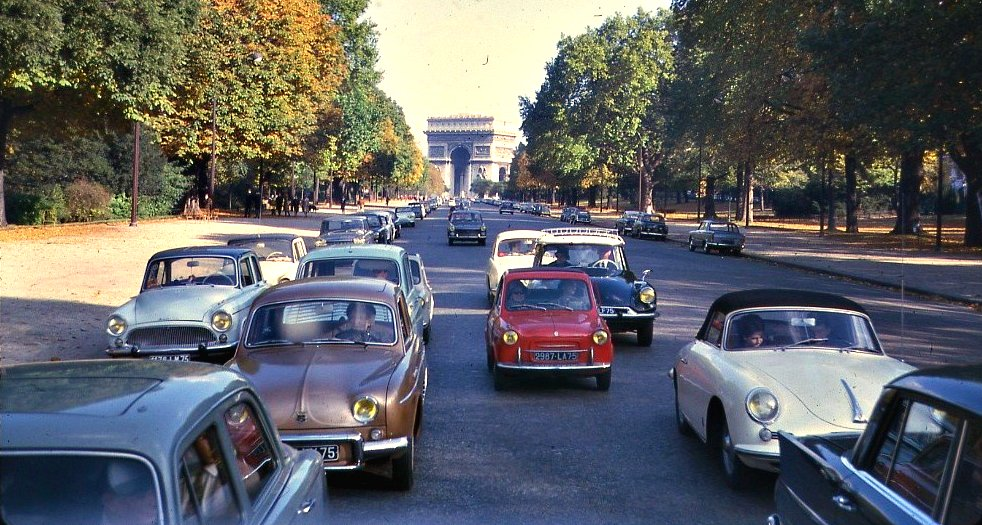
Avenue Foch in 1962

During the Second World War, the street was nicknamed Avenue Boche by the Parisians ("Boche" being a slang word for "German"). The local headquarters of the Gestapo were located for a time at number 72; the office of Section IV B4 of the Gestapo, the Juden Referat, which was responsible for the arrest and deportation of French Jews to the concentration camps, had its office at 31 bis Avenue Foch. British agent Peter Churchill was tortured on the fifth floor of number 84. He survived the war dying in 1972.

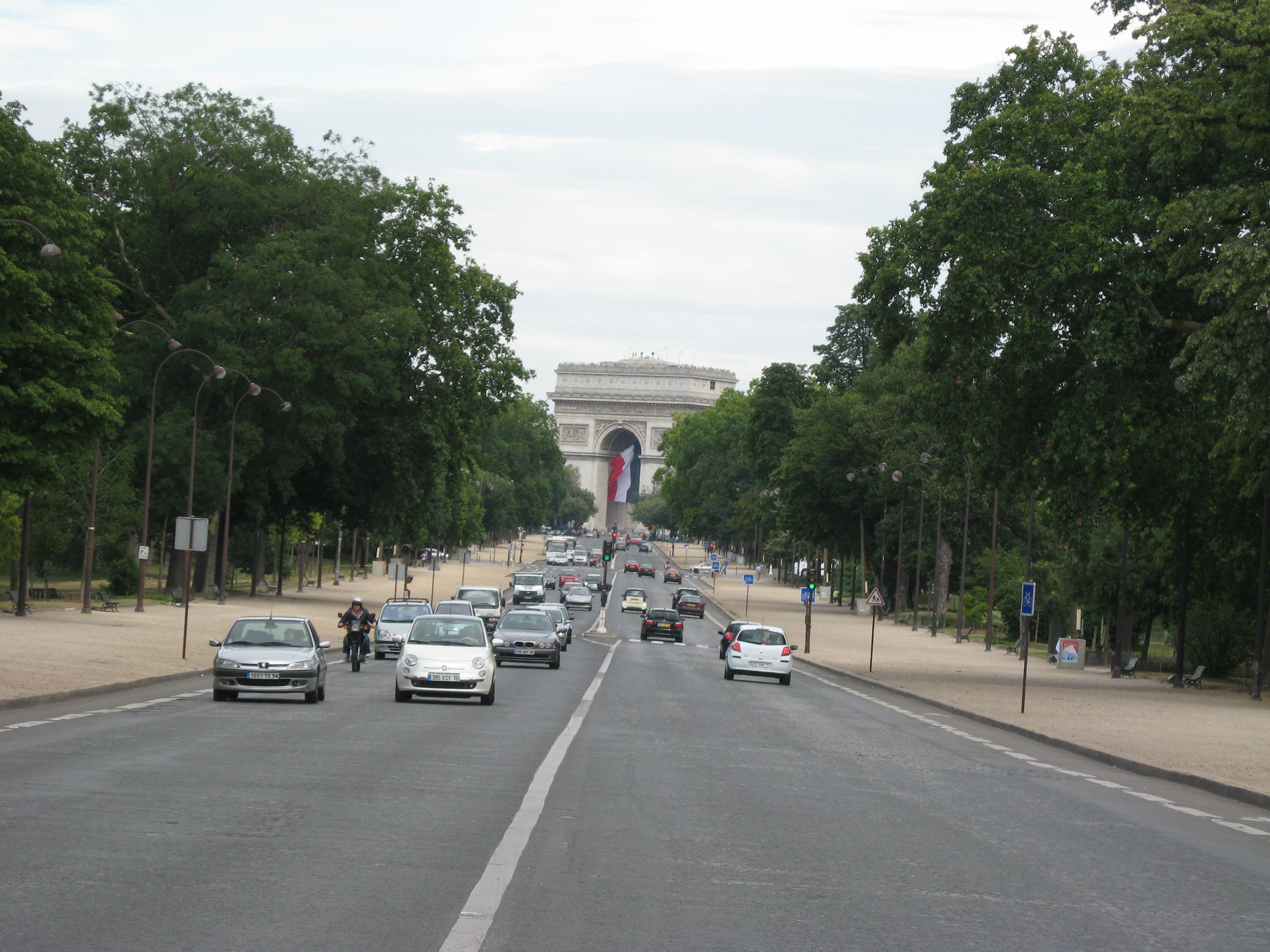
Avenue Foch in 2009

== The Gardens ==
The Gardens of the Avenue Foch occupy a space of 6.62 hectares, within the avenue's dimensions (1,200 metres long and 140 metres wide). In addition to the 4,000 trees that line the avenue, the garden was originally planted with 2,400 different species of trees and plants, making it, as Alphand wrote, "a kind of arboretum". Many of the original trees can still be found in the gardens, including a chestnut tree from India, 4.7 metres in circumference, an elm tree from Siberia, 3.8 metres in circumference, along with a giant Catalpa tree, 3.5 metres in circumference, all three dating from 1852.

The gardens contain a monument to Adolphe Alphand, designed by architect Jules Formigé, with sculpture by Jules Dalou. The monument was dedicated on 14 December 1899, eight years after Alphand's death.

== See also ==
- 84 Avenue Foch
- History of parks and gardens of Paris
- List of most expensive streets by city
- Napoleon III
- Paris during the Second Empire
- Rothschild family
- List of streets named after Ferdinand Foch
