= Paul Mitchell (hairdresser) =

Scottish hairstylist (1936–1989)

- Born: Cyril Thomson Mitchell; January 27, 1936; Carnwath, Scotland
- Died: April 21, 1989 (aged 53); Los Angeles, California, U.S.
- Occupation: Hairstylist
- Known for: Co-founding John Paul Mitchell Systems

Paul Mitchell (born Cyril Thomson Mitchell; January 27, 1936 – April 21, 1989) was a Scottish American hairstylist and co-founder of John Paul Mitchell Systems, a company that sells hair care products and, since 2000, also runs hairdressing schools.

== Early life ==
Paul Mitchell was born in Carnwath in Scotland. His mother Jenny was the village's first hairdresser. His family moved to London in 1939. He trained as a silversmith before enrolling in the Morris School of Hairdressing at age sixteen. By eighteen he had won multiple hairdressing competitions.

== Career ==
After graduating he worked as a hairdresser in London salons, moving to Vidal Sassoon's in Bond Street in the early 1960s. In 1965, Sassoon sent him to New York City to train staff at his first location in the United States. Mitchell left Sassoon's employ in 1967 and headed up Crimpers, a salon within the Henri Bendel flagship store on Fifth Avenue. Its success led to further branches opening in Boston, Chicago, Dallas and Philadelphia. In 1971 he took a break from hairdressing before opening his salon Superhair in New York in 1972. In 1974 he sold Superhair and moved to Hawaii. By the end of the 1970s he demonstrated hairdressing techniques at up to 150 beauty shows per year.

In 1980 he and John Paul DeJoria founded John Paul Mitchell Systems, selling hair care products via hair salons under the Paul Mitchell brand name, marketed as professional quality products for home use. The company thrived and later expanded into hairdressing schools.

In 1985, Mitchell established an awapuhi farm on the Big Island of Hawaii.

== Personal life ==
Mitchell married Jolina Zandueta Wyrzykowski, an American fashion model and actress with Polish-Filipina family roots. Their only child, Angus Mitchell, was born in 1970 and died in 2024.

In 1988, Mitchell was diagnosed with pancreatic cancer. He died in 1989 in Cedars Sinai Medical Center. He is buried on his estate on the Big Island of Hawaii. Angus inherited his father's share of John Paul Mitchell Systems & Schools and opened his own salon, AngusM in Beverly Hills, CA.
