= List of streets named after Ferdinand Foch =

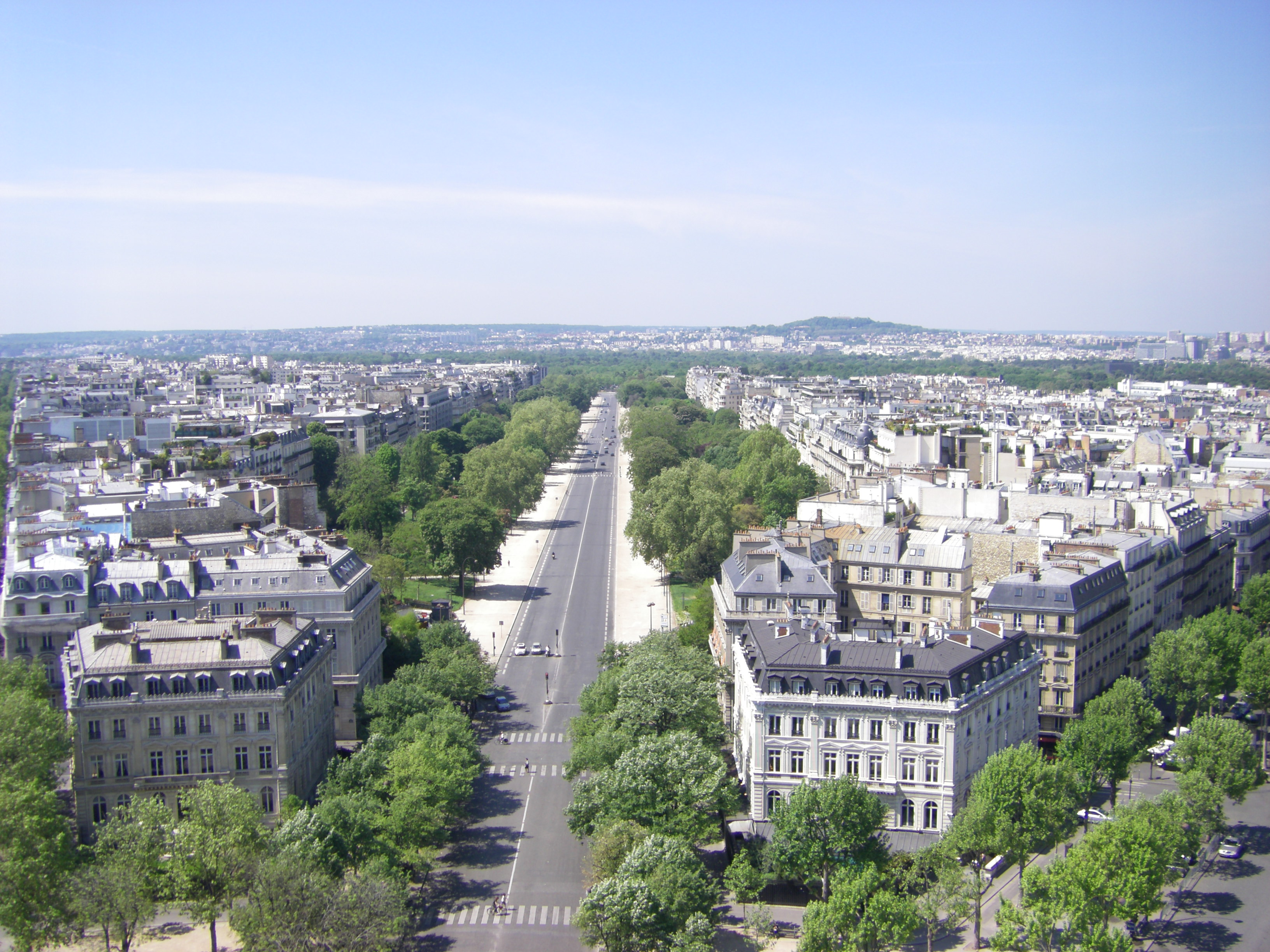
Avenue Foch in Paris

Streets named after Ferdinand Foch can be found in many cities of France and in many other places around the world. Marshal Ferdinand Foch (1851-1929) was Supreme Allied Commander during the First World War.

The following is a list of streets honouring Ferdinand Foch around the world.

== Places ==
=== Australia ===
- Foch Avenue, in Coburg, Melbourne, Victoria
- Foch Avenue, in Gymea, Sydney, New South Wales
- Foch Road, in Silvan, Victoria
- Foch Street, in Ashgrove, Brisbane, Queensland
- Foch Street, in Box Hill South, Melbourne, Victoria
- Foch Street, in Mowbray, Launceston, Tasmania
- Foch Street, in North Shore, Geelong, Victoria
- Foch Street, in Ormond, Melbourne, Victoria
- Foch Street, in Reservoir, Melbourne, Victoria
- Foch Street, in Tugun, Gold Coast, Queensland
- Foch Street, in Wynnum West, Brisbane, Queensland

=== Belgium ===
- Avenue Maréchal Foch/Maarschalk Fochlaan, in Schaerbeek, Brussels
- Avenue Maréchal Foch, in Mons
- Avenue Maréchal Foch, in Rixensart
- Fochlaan, in Knokke-Heist
- Maarschalk Fochlaan, in Ypres
- Maarschalk Fochstraat, in Leopoldsburg
- Rue Maréchal Foch, in Ans
- Rue du Maréchal Foch, in Antoing
- Rue Maréchal Foch, in Charleroi
- Rue du Maréchal Foch, in Châtelet
- Rue du Maréchal Foch, in Dour
- Rue Maréchal Foch, in Engis
- Rue Maréchal Foch, in Flémalle
- Rue Maréchal Foch, in Liège
- Rue du Maréchal Foch, in Tellin
- Rue Maréchal Foch, in Virton
- Rue Maréchal Foch, in Visé
- Veldmaarschalk Fochstraat, in Bruges

=== Brazil ===
- Rua Marechal Foch, in Belo Horizonte, Minas Gerais
- Rua Marechal Foch, in Rio de Janeiro, Rio de Janeiro

=== Cameroon ===
- Rue Foch, in Douala

=== Canada ===
- Foch Avenue, in the Etobicoke district of Toronto, Ontario
- Foch Avenue, in Winnipeg, Manitoba
- Foch Street, in Capreol, Ontario
- Place Foch, in Laval, Québec
- Rue Foch, in Granby, Québec
- Rue Foch, in Montréal, Québec
- Rue Foch, in Saint-Jean-sur-Richelieu, Québec
- Rue Maréchal-Foch, in Québec City, Québec
- Rue du Maréchal-Foch, in Sainte-Julie, Québec

=== China ===
- Central Yan'an Road, a major thoroughfare in Shanghai, was called Avenue Foch between 1920 and 1943

=== Ecuador ===
- Calle Mariscal Foch, in Quito

=== France ===
- Avenue Foch, in Brest
- Avenue Foch, in Dijon
- Avenue Foch, in Jonzac
- Avenue Foch, in La Garenne-Colombes
- Avenue Foch, in Le Havre
- Avenue Foch, in Lille
- Avenue Foch, in Lyon
- Avenue Foch, in Metz
- Avenue Foch, in Montmorency, Val-d'Oise
- Avenue Foch, in Nancy
- Avenue Foch, in Nice
- Avenue Foch, a major avenue in the 16th arrondissement of Paris
- Avenue Foch, in Quend
- Avenue Foch, in Vernon, Eure
- Avenue Maréchal Foch, in Béziers
- Avenue Maréchal Foch, in Brive-la-Gaillarde
- Avenue du Maréchal Foch, in Chatou
- Avenue du Maréchal Foch, in Créteil
- Avenue du Maréchal Foch, in Dreux
- Avenue du Maréchal Foch, in Marseille
- Avenue du Maréchal Foch, in Martigné-Ferchaud
- Avenue du Maréchal Foch, in Mont-de-Marsan
- Avenue du Maréchal Foch, in Poissy
- Avenue du Maréchal Foch, in Saint-Germain-en-Laye
- Avenue du Maréchal Foch, in Saint-Méen-le-Grand
- Avenue du Maréchal Foch, in Saint-Michel-Chef-Chef
- Avenue du Maréchal Foch, in Saumur
- Boulevard du Maréchal Foch, in Angers
- Boulevard du Maréchal Foch, in Saint-Quay-Portrieux
- Place Ferdinand Foch, in Saint-Jean-de-Luz
- Place du Maréchal Foch, in Arras
- Place du Maréchal Foch, in Béthune
- Place du Maréchal Foch, in Châlons-en-Champagne
- Place du Maréchal Foch, in Martigny, Aisne
- Place du Maréchal Foch, in Montdidier, Somme
- Place du Maréchal Foch, in Montoire-sur-le-Loir
- Rue Ferdinand Foch, in Bully-les-Mines
- Rue Ferdinand Foch, in Poitiers
- Rue Foch, in Commercy
- Rue Foch, in Fabrègues
- Rue Foch, in Marsillargues
- Rue Foch, in Montpellier
- Rue Maréchal Ferdinand Foch, in Quimper
- Rue du Maréchal Foch, in Binic-Étables-sur-Mer
- Rue du Maréchal Foch, in Bischwiller
- Rue Maréchal Foch, in Bompas, Pyrénées-Orientales
- Rue du Maréchal Foch, in Bouchavesnes-Bergen
- Rue Maréchal Foch, in Canet-en-Roussillon
- Rue Maréchal Foch, in Clermont-Ferrand
- Rue du Maréchal Foch, in Cléry-Saint-André
- Rue du Maréchal Foch, in Delme, Moselle
- Rue du Maréchal Foch, in Frontignan
- Rue du Maréchal Foch, in Haguenau
- Rue du Maréchal Foch, in Hundling
- Rue du Maréchal Foch, in Ingwiller
- Rue du Maréchal Foch, in La Bernerie-en-Retz
- Rue Maréchal Foch, in Lamballe-Armor
- Rue du Maréchal Foch, in Le Château-d'Oléron
- Rue Maréchal Foch, in Le Creusot
- Rue du Maréchal Foch, in Le Portel
- Rue du Maréchal Foch, in Lingolsheim
- Rue du Maréchal Foch, in Longueau
- Rue du Maréchal Foch, in Loos, Nord
- Rue du Maréchal Foch, in Lorient
- Rue du Maréchal Foch, in Mireval
- Rue du Maréchal Foch, in Mommenheim, Bas-Rhin
- Rue Maréchal Foch, in Neuvy-Saint-Sépulchre
- Rue du Maréchal Foch, in Orléans
- Rue du Maréchal Foch, in Panazol
- Rue Maréchal Foch, in Pau, Pyrénées-Atlantiques
- Rue du Maréchal Foch, in Péronne, Somme
- Rue Maréchal Foch, in Perpignan
- Rue du Maréchal Foch, in Phalsbourg
- Rue du Maréchal Foch, in Pléneuf-Val-André
- Rue du Maréchal Foch, in Pontacq
- Rue du Maréchal Foch, in Pornic
- Rue du Maréchal Foch, in Port-des-Barques
- Rue Maréchal Foch, in Riorges
- Rue Maréchal Foch, in Rivesaltes
- Rue Maréchal Foch, in Romagnat
- Rue du Maréchal Foch, in Saint-Avold
- Rue du Maréchal Foch, in Saint-Brieuc
- Rue du Maréchal Foch, in Saint-Germain-du-Puy
- Rue du Maréchal Foch, in Saint-Germain-en-Laye
- Rue du Maréchal Foch, in Saint-Gobain, Aisne
- Rue Maréchal Foch, in Saint-Hippolyte, Pyrénées-Orientales
- Rue du Maréchal Foch, in Saint-Quentin, Aisne
- Rue du Maréchal Foch, in Sarreguemines
- Rue du Maréchal Foch, in Sarre-Union
- Rue du Maréchal Foch, in Saverne
- Rue du Maréchal Foch, in Strasbourg
- Rue du Maréchal Foch, in Sully-sur-Loire
- Rue du Maréchal Foch, in Tergnier
- Rue du Maréchal Foch, in Tours
- Rue du Maréchal Foch, in Versailles, Yvelines
- Rue du Maréchal Foch, in Villecresnes

==== French Polynesia ====
- Avenue du Maréchal Foch, in Papeete

==== Guadeloupe ====
- Avenue du Maréchal Foch, in Saint-Claude
- Rue Foch, in Capesterre-Belle-Eau
- Rue Foch, in Le Moule
- Rue Maréchal Foch, in Baie-Mahault

==== New Caledonia ====
- Avenue du Maréchal Foch, in Nouméa

==== Réunion ====
- Rue Foch, in Saint-Denis
- Rue Maréchal Foch, in Le Tampon
- Rue du Maréchal Foch, in Saint-Joseph

==== Saint Pierre and Miquelon ====
- Rue Maréchal Foch, in Saint-Pierre

=== Italy ===
- Via Foch, in Agordo, Belluno
- Via Foch, in Cencenighe Agordino, Belluno
- Via Foch, in Taibon Agordino, Belluno
- Via Foch, in Voltago Agordino, Belluno

=== Lebanon ===
- Rue Foch (شارع فوش), in Beirut

=== New Zealand ===
- Foch Avenue, in Auckland

=== Poland ===
- Aleja Marszałka Ferdinanda Focha, in Kraków
- Marszałka Ferdynanda Focha, in Chrzanów
- Marszałka Ferdynanda Focha, in Częstochowa
- Marszałka Ferdynanda Focha, in Gdańsk
- Marszałka Ferdynanda Focha, in Grudziądz
- Marszałka Ferdynanda Focha, in Nowy Dwór Mazowiecki
- Marszałka Ferdynanda Focha, in Radom
- Marszałka Ferdynanda Focha, in Warsaw
- Ulica Ferdynanda Focha, in Bydgoszcz
- Ulica Focha, in Gdynia
- Ulica Focha, in Ostrowiec Świętokrzyski
- Ulica Focha, in Pruszków
- Ulica Wybrzeże Focha, in Przemyśl

=== Singapore ===
- Foch Road, in Singapore

=== Spain ===
- Carrer del Mariscal Foch, in Valencia

=== United States ===
- Foch Avenue, in Lebanon, New Hampshire
- Foch Avenue, in Portsmouth, New Hampshire
- Foch Avenue, in Providence, Rhode Island
- Foch Avenue, in Seekonk, Massachusetts
- Foch Avenue, in Staten Island, New York City, New York
- Foch Avenue, in Westfield, Massachusetts
- Foch Avenue, in West Portsmouth, Ohio
- Foch Avenue, in Worcester, Massachusetts
- Foch Avenue, in Yuma, Colorado
- Foch Boulevard, in North Hempstead, New York
- Foch Boulevard, in Phillipsburg, New Jersey
- Foch Boulevard, in Queens, New York City, New York
- Foch Road, in New Orleans, Louisiana
- Foch Road, in Schenectady, New York
- Foch Street, in Baton Rouge, Louisiana
- Foch Street, in Bryan, Texas
- Foch Street, in Cambridge, Massachusetts
- Foch Street, in Celina, Ohio
- Foch Street, in Covington, Virginia
- Foch Street, in Eastland, Texas
- Foch Street, in Ellwood City, Pennsylvania
- Foch Street, in Eugene, Oregon
- Foch Street, in Fort Worth, Texas
- Foch Street, in Framingham, Massachusetts
- Foch Street, in Gordon, Nebraska
- Foch Street, in Greensboro, North Carolina
- Foch Street, in Hamden, Connecticut
- Foch Street, in Harrisburg, Arkansas
- Foch Street, in Herrin, Illinois
- Foch Street, in Kutztown, Pennsylvania
- Foch Street, in Lafayette, Louisiana
- Foch Street, in Lewiston, Maine
- Foch Street, in Livonia, Michigan
- Foch Street, in Lowell, Massachusetts
- Foch Street, in Manchester, New Hampshire
- Foch Street, in Maryville, Tennessee
- Foch Street, in Massillon, Ohio
- Foch Street, in Norton, Ohio
- Foch Street, in Prichard, Alabama
- Foch Street, in Ranger, Texas
- Foch Street, in Rochester, New Hampshire
- Foch Street, in Saint Petersburg, Florida
- Foch Street, in Sanford, Maine
- Foch Street, in Sayreville, New Jersey
- Foch Street, in Standard City, Illinois

=== Uruguay ===
- Calle Mariscal Foch, in Montevideo

== See also ==
- Jardins de l'Avenue-Foch, a linear park spanning the length of Avenue Foch in Paris, France
- Gare de l'avenue Foch, a railway station located in the 16th arrondissement of Paris, France
