= Circles of latitude between the 15th parallel south and the 20th parallel south =

Circles of latitude

Following are circles of latitude between the 15th parallel south and the 20th parallel south:

== 16th parallel south ==
16th parallel south (interactive map)

The 16th parallel south is a circle of latitude that is 16 degrees south of the Earth's equatorial plane. It crosses the Atlantic Ocean, Africa, the Indian Ocean, Australasia, the Pacific Ocean and South America.

A section of the border between Mozambique and Zimbabwe is defined by the parallel.

=== Around the world ===
Starting at the Prime Meridian and heading eastwards, the parallel 16° south passes through:

Coordinates	Country, territory or sea	Notes
16°0′S 0°0′E	Atlantic Ocean	
16°0′S 11°48′E	Angola	
16°0′S 22°0′E	Zambia	
16°0′S 28°53′E	Zimbabwe	
16°0′S 30°25′E	Mozambique / Zimbabwe border	
16°0′S 30°55′E	Mozambique	For about 20 km
16°0′S 31°6′E	Zimbabwe	For about 9 km
16°0′S 31°11′E	Mozambique	
16°0′S 34°22′E	Malawi	
16°0′S 35°49′E	Mozambique	
16°0′S 40°7′E	Indian Ocean	Mozambique Channel
16°0′S 45°9′E	Madagascar	
16°0′S 49°41′E	Indian Ocean	Passing just south of Tromelin Island, French Southern and Antarctic Lands; Passing just north of Albatross Island, Mauritius
16°0′S 124°29′E	Australia	Western Australia; Northern Territory
16°0′S 137°12′E	Indian Ocean	Gulf of Carpentaria
16°0′S 141°24′E	Australia	Queensland
16°0′S 145°26′E	Pacific Ocean	Passing through the Coral Sea Islands Territory, Australia
16°0′S 167°11′E	Vanuatu	Island of Malakula
16°0′S 167°23′E	Pacific Ocean	Coral Sea
16°0′S 168°14′E	Vanuatu	Pentecost Island
16°0′S 167°23′E	Pacific Ocean	Passing just north of Vanua Levu island, Fiji; Passing just north of Qelelevu island, Fiji; Passing just south of Niuatoputapu island, Tonga; Passing just south of Motu One atoll, French Polynesia; Passing just north of Tupai atoll, French Polynesia; Passing just south of Makatea atoll, French Polynesia; Passing just south of Kaukura atoll, French Polynesia; Passing just north of Niau atoll, French Polynesia
16°0′S 145°58′W	French Polynesia	Passing through Toau atoll
16°0′S 145°53′W	Pacific Ocean	Passing just north of Fakarava atoll, French Polynesia; Passing just south of Kauehi atoll, French Polynesia; Passing just north of Raraka atoll, French Polynesia
16°0′S 142°26′W	French Polynesia	Passing through Raroia atoll
16°0′S 142°19′W	Pacific Ocean	Passing just south of Takume atoll, French Polynesia; Passing just south of Fangatau atoll, French Polynesia
16°0′S 140°10′W	French Polynesia	Passing through Fakahina atoll
16°0′S 140°6′W	Pacific Ocean	
16°0′S 74°2′W	Peru	The border with Bolivia is in Lake Titicaca
16°0′S 69°17′W	Bolivia	
16°0′S 60°11′W	Brazil	Mato Grosso; Goiás; Federal District - passing just south of Brasília; Goiás - for about 18 km Minas Gerais; Bahia
16°0′S 38°55′W	Atlantic Ocean	
16°0′S 5°46′W	Saint Helena, Ascension and Tristan da Cunha	Island of Saint Helena
16°0′S 5°42′W	Atlantic Ocean	

== 17th parallel south ==
17th parallel south (interactive map)

The 17th parallel south is a circle of latitude that is 17 degrees south of the Earth's equatorial plane. It crosses the Atlantic Ocean, Africa, the Indian Ocean, Australasia, the Pacific Ocean and South America.

=== Around the world ===
Starting at the Prime Meridian and heading eastwards, the parallel 17° south passes through:

Coordinates	Country, territory or ocean	Notes
17°0′S 0°0′E	Atlantic Ocean	
17°0′S 11°46′E	Angola	
17°0′S 12°58′E	Namibia	
17°0′S 13°25′E	Angola	
17°0′S 22°40′E	Zambia	The border with Zimbabwe is in Lake Kariba
17°0′S 27°48′E	Zimbabwe	
17°0′S 32°53′E	Mozambique	
17°0′S 35°3′E	Malawi	
17°0′S 35°18′E	Mozambique	
17°0′S 39°5′E	Indian Ocean	Mozambique Channel - passing just north of Juan de Nova Island, French Southern and Antarctic Lands
17°0′S 44°14′E	Madagascar	
17°0′S 49°33′E	Indian Ocean	
17°0′S 49°51′E	Madagascar	Île Sainte-Marie
17°0′S 49°53′E	Indian Ocean	Passing just south of Coco Island, Mauritius
17°0′S 122°21′E	Australia	Western Australia
17°0′S 123°15′E	Indian Ocean	King Sound
17°0′S 123°49′E	Australia	Western Australia; Northern Territory; Queensland - mainland and Wellesley Islands
17°0′S 139°5′E	Indian Ocean	Gulf of Carpentaria
17°0′S 139°16′E	Australia	Queensland - Horseshoe Island
17°0′S 139°17′E	Indian Ocean	Gulf of Carpentaria
17°0′S 139°29′E	Australia	Queensland - Bentnick Island
17°0′S 139°31′E	Indian Ocean	Gulf of Carpentaria
17°0′S 140°57′E	Australia	Queensland
17°0′S 145°53′E	Pacific Ocean	Passing through the Coral Sea Islands Territory, Australia
17°0′S 168°37′E	Vanuatu	Island of Tongariki
17°0′S 168°38′E	Pacific Ocean	
17°0′S 177°20′E	Fiji	Yasawa Islands
17°0′S 177°21′E	Pacific Ocean	Bligh Water
17°0′S 178°42′E	Fiji	Vanua Levu island
17°0′S 178°46′E	Pacific Ocean	Koro Sea
17°0′S 179°55′E	Fiji	Taveuni island
17°0′S 179°57′E	Pacific Ocean	Passing just north of the Lau Islands, Fiji; Passing just south of Maupihaa atoll, French Polynesia; Passing just south of Raiatea island, French Polynesia; Passing just south of Huahine island, French Polynesia
17°0′S 149°35′W	French Polynesia	Tetiaroa atoll
17°0′S 149°32′W	Pacific Ocean	Passing just south of Tahanea atoll, French Polynesia; Passing just north of Motutunga atoll, French Polynesia; Passing just south of Tepoto atoll, French Polynesia
17°0′S 143°5′W	French Polynesia	Marutea atoll
17°0′S 143°4′W	Pacific Ocean	Passing just south of Rekareka atoll, French Polynesia
17°0′S 72°6′W	Peru	
17°0′S 69°22′W	Bolivia	
17°0′S 58°25′W	Brazil	Mato Grosso; Goiás - passing just south of Goiânia; Minas Gerais; Bahia
17°0′S 39°10′W	Atlantic Ocean	

== 18th parallel south ==
18th parallel south (interactive map)

The 18th parallel south is a circle of latitude that is 18 degrees south of the Earth's equatorial plane. It crosses the Atlantic Ocean, Africa, the Indian Ocean, Australasia, the Pacific Ocean and South America.

=== Around the world ===
Starting at the Prime Meridian and heading eastwards, the parallel 18° south passes through:

Coordinates	Country, territory or ocean	Notes
18°0′S 0°0′E	Atlantic Ocean	
18°0′S 11°49′E	Namibia	
18°0′S 20°41′E	Angola	
18°0′S 20°53′E	Namibia	Caprivi Strip
18°0′S 21°22′E	Angola	
18°0′S 21°34′E	Namibia	Caprivi Strip
18°0′S 24°18′E	Botswana	
18°0′S 24°28′E	Namibia	Caprivi Strip
18°0′S 24°37′E	Botswana	
18°0′S 25°16′E	Zimbabwe	
18°0′S 25°57′E	Zambia	For about 3 km
18°0′S 25°59′E	Zimbabwe	
18°0′S 26°34′E	Zambia	
18°0′S 26°49′E	Zimbabwe	Passing just south of Harare
18°0′S 32°57′E	Mozambique	
18°0′S 37°0′E	Indian Ocean	Mozambique Channel
18°0′S 44°1′E	Madagascar	
18°0′S 49°25′E	Indian Ocean	
18°0′S 122°11′E	Australia	Western Australia
18°0′S 122°12′E	Indian Ocean	Roebuck Bay - passing just south of Broome, Western Australia
18°0′S 122°22′E	Australia	Western Australia; Northern Territory; Queensland
18°0′S 146°4′E	Pacific Ocean	Passing through Australia's Coral Sea Islands Territory; Passing just south of Efate island, Vanuatu
18°0′S 168°42′E	Pacific Ocean	
18°0′S 177°16′E	Fiji	Island of Viti Levu
18°0′S 178°38′E	Pacific Ocean	Koro Sea
18°0′S 179°14′E	Fiji	Island of Gau
18°0′S 179°21′E	Pacific Ocean	Koro Sea
18°0′S 179°3′W	Fiji	Island of Nayau
18°0′S 179°2′W	Pacific Ocean	Passing just north of Fonualei, Tonga; Passing just north of Palmerston Island, Cook Islands; Passing just south of the islands of Tahiti, Mehetia and Reitoru, French Polynesia
18°0′S 142°18′W	French Polynesia	Marokau atoll
18°0′S 142°11′W	Pacific Ocean	Passing between the atolls of Hao and Amanu, French Polynesia
18°0′S 70°53′W	Peru	
18°0′S 69°45′W	Chile	
18°0′S 69°9′W	Bolivia	
18°0′S 57°38′W	Brazil	Mato Grosso do Sul; Mato Grosso - for about 11 km Mato Grosso do Sul - for about 9 km Mato Grosso - for about 16 km Mato Grosso do Sul - for about 22 km Mato Grosso - for about 18 km Goiás; Minas Gerais; Espírito Santo; Bahia
18°0′S 39°29′W	Atlantic Ocean	

== 19th parallel south ==
19th parallel south (interactive map)

The 19th parallel south is a circle of latitude that is 19 degrees south of the Earth's equatorial plane. It crosses the Atlantic Ocean, Africa, the Indian Ocean, Australasia, the Pacific Ocean and South America.

=== Around the world ===
Starting at the Prime Meridian and heading eastwards, the parallel 19° south passes through:

Coordinates	Country, territory or sea	Notes
19°0′S 0°0′E	Atlantic Ocean	
19°0′S 12°28′E	Namibia	
19°0′S 21°0′E	Botswana	
19°0′S 25°59′E	Zimbabwe	
19°0′S 32°42′E	Mozambique	
19°0′S 35°51′E	Indian Ocean	Mozambique Channel
19°0′S 44°14′E	Madagascar	Passing just south of Antananarivo
19°0′S 49°5′E	Indian Ocean	
19°0′S 121°33′E	Australia	Western Australia; Northern Territory; Queensland
19°0′S 146°22′E	Coral Sea	Passing between Rattlesnake Island and Acheron Island, Queensland, Australia; Passing just north of Marion Reef in Australia's Coral Sea Islands Territory; Passing just north of the Chesterfield Islands, New Caledonia
19°0′S 169°17′E	Vanuatu	Southernmost tip of Erromango island
19°0′S 169°17′E	Pacific Ocean	
19°0′S 178°10′E	Fiji	Kadavu island
19°0′S 178°29′E	Pacific Ocean	Passing just north of Matuku Island, Fiji
19°0′S 179°52′W	Fiji	Totoya island
19°0′S 179°51′W	Pacific Ocean	Passing just south of Kabara island, Fiji; Passing just north of Fulaga island, Fiji; Passing just south of Late island, Tonga
19°0′S 169°55′W	Niue	
19°0′S 169°48′W	Pacific Ocean	Passing just south of Aitutaki island, Cook Islands; Passing just north of Manuae atoll, Cook Islands; Passing just south of Nengonengo atoll, French Polynesia; Passing just north of Manuhangi atoll, French Polynesia; Passing just north of Paraoa atoll, French Polynesia; Passing just south of Vahitahi atoll, French Polynesia
19°0′S 70°19′W	Chile	
19°0′S 68°54′W	Bolivia	Passing just north of Sucre
19°0′S 57°42′W	Brazil	Mato Grosso do Sul; Goiás; Minas Gerais; Espírito Santo
19°0′S 39°44′W	Atlantic Ocean	

== 20th parallel south ==
20th parallel south (interactive map)

The 20th parallel south is a circle of latitude that is 20 degrees south of the Earth's equatorial plane. It crosses the Atlantic Ocean, Africa, the Indian Ocean, Australasia, the Pacific Ocean and South America.

=== Around the world ===
Starting at the Prime Meridian and heading eastwards, the parallel 20° south passes through:

Coordinates	Country, territory or ocean	Notes
20°0′S 0°0′E	Atlantic Ocean	
20°0′S 13°1′E	Namibia	Kunene, Otjozondjupa
20°0′S 21°0′E	Botswana	Ghanzi, Central
20°0′S 26°55′E	Zimbabwe	
20°0′S 33°1′E	Mozambique	
20°0′S 34°45′E	Indian Ocean	Mozambique Channel
20°0′S 44°28′E	Madagascar	
20°0′S 48°47′E	Indian Ocean	
20°0′S 57°35′E	Mauritius	
20°0′S 57°38′E	Indian Ocean	
20°0′S 119°5′E	Australia	Western Australia
20°0′S 119°22′E	Indian Ocean	
20°0′S 119°44′E	Australia	Western Australia; Northern Territory; Queensland
20°0′S 148°16′E	Pacific Ocean	Coral Sea
20°0′S 148°26′E	Australia	Queensland – Gloucester Island
20°0′S 148°28′E	Pacific Ocean	Coral Sea; Passing south of Marion Reef in Australia's Coral Sea Islands Territory; Passing just south of the Ilots du Mouillage, New Caledonia; Passing just north of Île Baaba, New Caledonia; Passing between the islands of Tanna and Anatom, Vanuatu
20°0′S 170°0′E	Pacific Ocean	Passing between the islands of Vatoa and Ono-i-Lau, Fiji; Passing through the Ha'apai island group, Tonga
20°0′S 158°8′W	Cook Islands	Island of Atiu
20°0′S 158°4′W	Pacific Ocean	Passing between the atolls of Hereheretue and Anuanuraro, French Polynesia; Passing between the atolls of Ahunui and Vanavana, French Polynesia
20°0′S 70°7′W	Chile	
20°0′S 68°33′W	Bolivia	
20°0′S 61°53′W	Paraguay	
20°0′S 58°10′W	Bolivia	
20°0′S 57°52′W	Brazil	Mato Grosso do Sul; São Paulo; Minas Gerais – passing through Belo Horizonte; Espírito Santo
20°0′S 39°44′W	Atlantic Ocean	

== See also ==
- Circles of latitude between the 10th parallel south and the 15th parallel south
- Circles of latitude between the 20th parallel south and the 25th parallel south
