= Two Groups Islands =

Coordinates: 18°08′S 142°15′W

Location of the Two Groups Islands in the Pacific Ocean

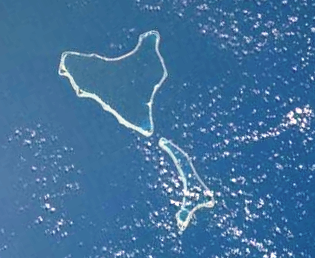
NASA picture of the Two Groups Islands.

The Two Groups Islands (French: Îles Deux Groupes [il dø ɡʁup]) is a minor subgroup of the Tuamotus in French Polynesia. It is formed by the atolls of Marokau to the north (populated by 100 people) and the uninhabited Ravahere to the south. The two atolls are separated by a 2 km (1 mi) wide sound.

== History ==
These two neighboring atolls were discovered by Louis Antoine de Bougainville in 1768. It was James Cook, however, who named them "Two Groups" the following year. He described Marokau and Revahere as a "chain of islands linked by reefs".

== Administration ==
Administratively the Two Groups Islands belong form the territory of the associated commune of Marokau, itself part of the commune of Hikueru, which consists of the two atolls of the Two Groups Islands (Marokau and Ravahere) and the three atolls of the associated commune of Hikueru (Hikueru, Reitoru and Tekokota).
