= Resolution Island =

Resolution Island may refer to:

- Resolution Island (Nunavut), an island in northern Canada
- Resolution Island (New Zealand), an island in southwestern New Zealand
- Tauere, an island in the Tuamotus in French Polynesia
- Resolution Island, a fictional island in the novel Brown on Resolution
