= 20th parallel =

20th parallel may refer to:

- 20th parallel north, a circle of latitude in the Northern Hemisphere
- 20th parallel south, a circle of latitude in the Southern Hemisphere
