= 19th parallel =

19th parallel may refer to:

- 19th parallel north, a circle of latitude in the Northern Hemisphere
- 19th parallel south, a circle of latitude in the Southern Hemisphere
