= Hikueru =

Atoll in French Polynesia

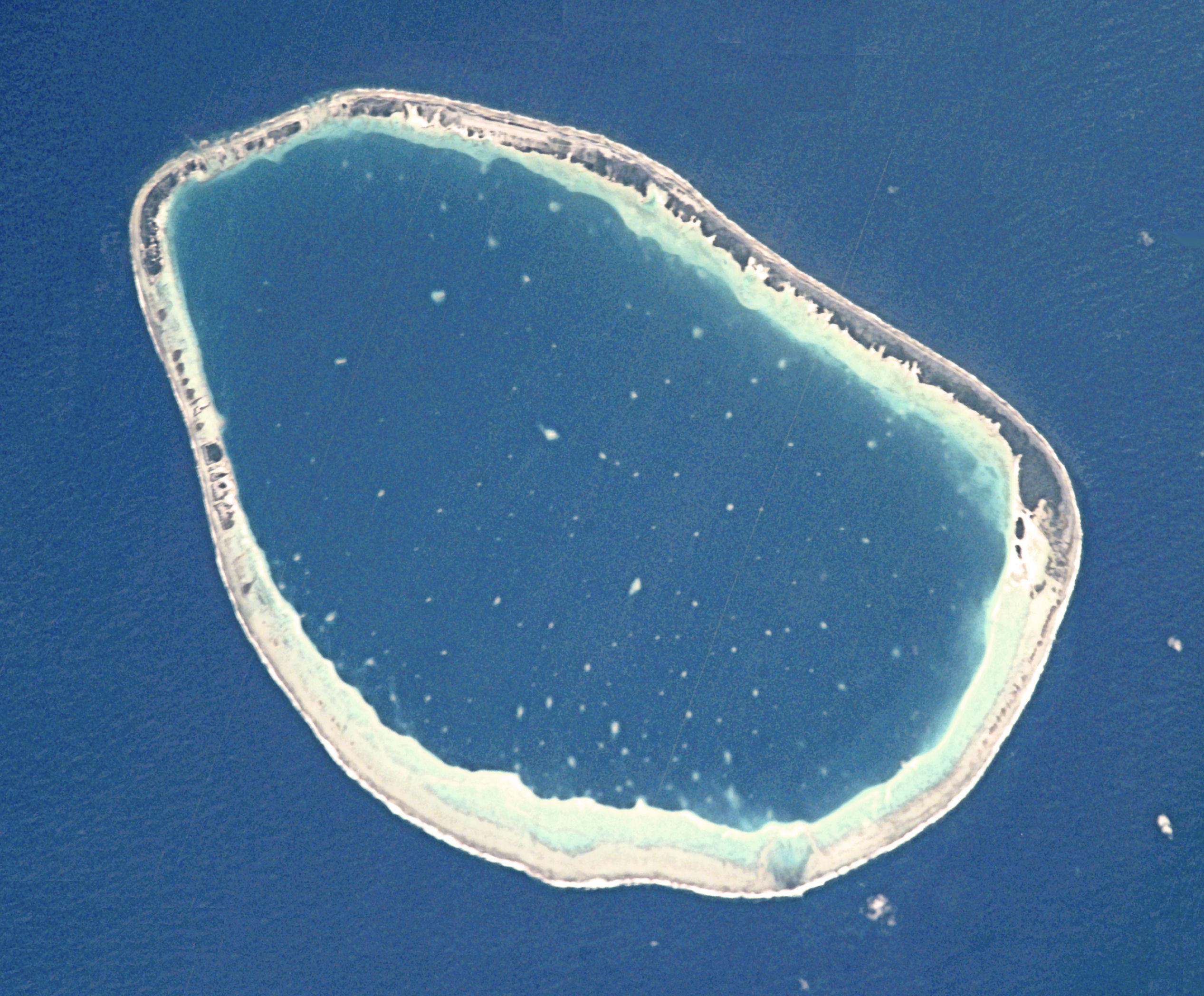
- NASA picture of Hikueru Atoll

- Location within French Polynesia

Geography
- Location: Pacific Ocean
- Coordinates: 17°35′20″S 142°37′00″W
- Archipelago: Tuamotus
- Area: 79 km^{2} (31 sq mi) (lagoon); 8 km^{2} (3 sq mi) (above water)
- Length: 15 km (9.3 mi)
- Width: 9.5 km (5.9 mi)

Administration
- France
- Overseas collectivity: French Polynesia
- Administrative subdivision: Îles Tuamotu-Gambier
- Commune: Hikueru
- Largest settlement: Tupapati

Demographics
- Population: 125 (2022)

Hikueru, Tiveru, or Te Kārena, is one of the Central Tuamotu atolls. The closest land to Hikueru is Tekokota Atoll, located 22 km to the north.

Hikueru Atoll's shape is roughly oval and it is 15 km in length and 9.5 km in width. It covers a land area of 8 km^{2} and a lagoon area of 79 km^{2}. There are many motu on its reef with a combined land area of about 25 km^{2}. Its lagoon is deep, with numerous coral heads.

At the 2022 census, the population of the commune of Hikueru was 199, of which 125 on Hikueru proper, and 74 on the atoll of Marokau. Its most important village is Tupapati, located on the atoll Hikueru. There is a territorial airport on Hikueru which was opened in 2000.

Hikueru was the setting for Jack London's short story "The House of Mapuhi" in South Sea Tales (1911) and Armstrong Sperry's novel Call It Courage, which won the Newbery Medal in 1941.

== Demographics ==
| Atoll | Population (2022) | ! Area (km^{2}) |
|---|---|---|
| Hikueru | 125 | 8 |
| Marokau | 74 | 14.7 |
| Ravahere | 0 | 7 |
| Reitoru | 0 | 1.4 |
| Tekokota | 0 | 0.9 |
| Total | 199 | 32 |

== History ==
Hikueru Atoll was discovered by Bougainville in 1768. Spanish navigator Domingo de Boenechea sighted Hikueru in 1774 on his ship the Aguila. He named this atoll "San Juan".

Like Marokau, Hikueru used to be a large natural pearl oyster reserve. The 1903 cyclone wrought considerable damage, however, and caused the death of 377 people, including 261 from the island of Hao. In his South Sea Tales, Jack London gives a vivid description of this disastrous hurricane.

In the 1988 census, only 123 inhabitants were found to be still living on Hikueru. This was up to 268 by 2007. The population of this island makes a living by collecting copra. Up to the 1970s, it was one of the main deep-sea diving centres in the Tuamotu atolls.

== Transports ==
The atoll is served by the Hikueru Airport (IATA: HHZ, ICAO: NTGH).
