= 18th parallel =

18th parallel may refer to:

- 18th parallel north, a circle of latitude in the Northern Hemisphere
- 18th parallel south, a circle of latitude in the Southern Hemisphere
