= 16th parallel =

16th parallel may refer to:

- 16th parallel north, a circle of latitude in the Northern Hemisphere
- 16th parallel south, a circle of latitude in the Southern Hemisphere
