= Ravahere =

Atoll in French Polynesia

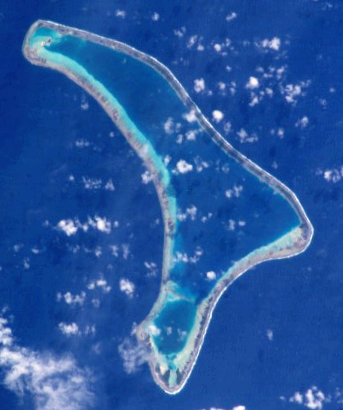
- NASA picture of Ravahere Atoll

- Location within French Polynesia

Geography
- Location: Pacific Ocean
- Coordinates: 18°13′S 142°09′W
- Archipelago: Tuamotus
- Area: 57.5 km^{2} (22.2 sq mi) (lagoon); 7 km^{2} (3 sq mi) (above water)
- Length: 20 km (12 mi)
- Width: 9.5 km (5.9 mi)

Administration
- France
- Overseas collectivity: French Polynesia
- Administrative subdivision: Tuamotus
- Commune: Hikueru

Demographics
- Population: Uninhabited (2012)

Ravahere is an atoll of the Tuamotu Archipelago in French Polynesia. It is located 53 km northwest of Nengonengo Atoll and it is separated by a 2 km sound from Marokau Atoll, its closest neighbor to the north.

Marokau and Ravahere form a minor subgroup of the Tuamotus known as the Two Groups Islands.

Ravahere Atoll is roughly boomerang-shaped. It measures 20 km in length with a maximum width of 9.5 km. The shallow lagoon has a surface area of 57.5 km^{2}, but there is no pass to enter it.

Ravahere is permanently uninhabited.

== History ==
The first recorded European who sighted the two neighboring atolls of Marokau and Ravahere was Louis Antoine de Bougainville in 1768.

== Administration ==
Ravahere belongs to the commune of Hikueru, which consists of the atolls of Hikueru, Marokau, Ravahere, Reitoru and Tekokota.

== Gallery ==
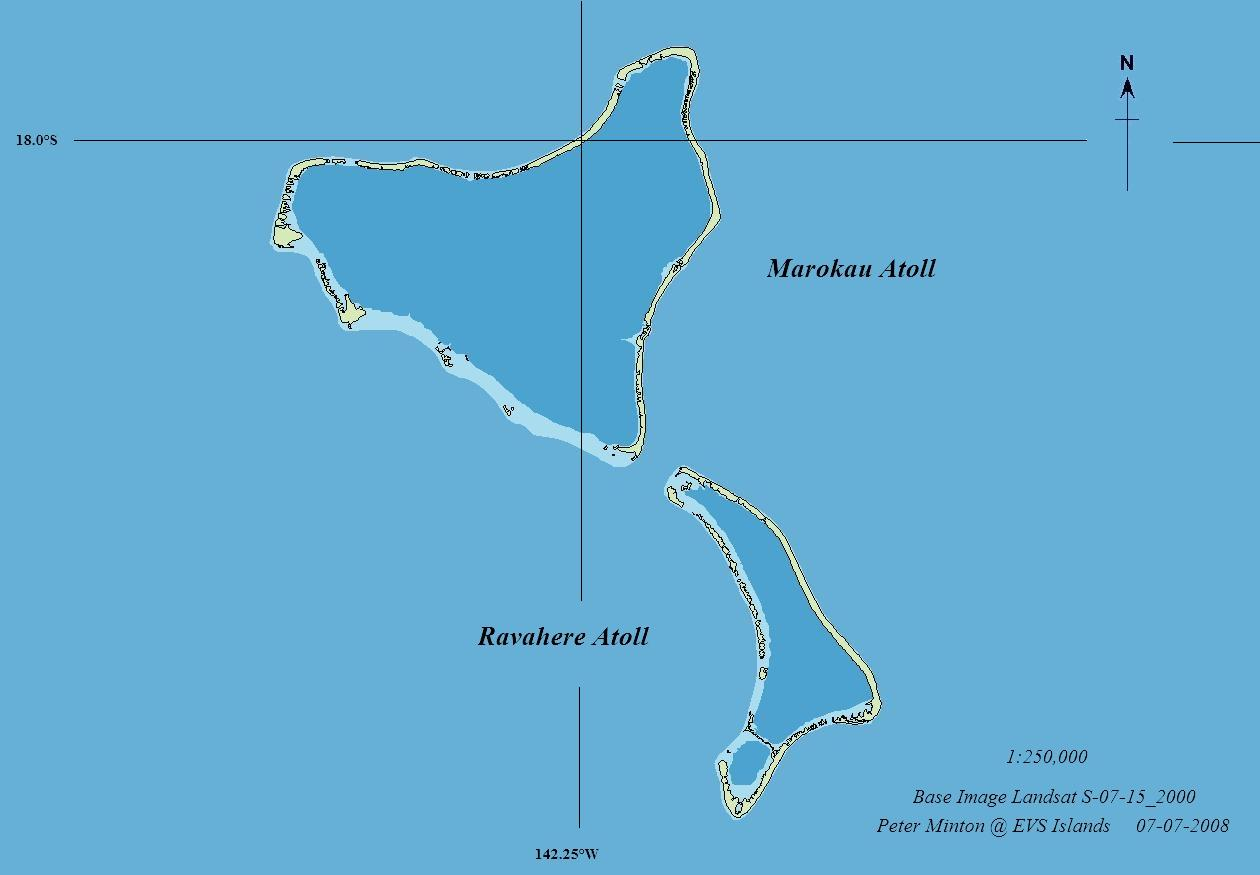
Map of Marokau and Ravahere atolls

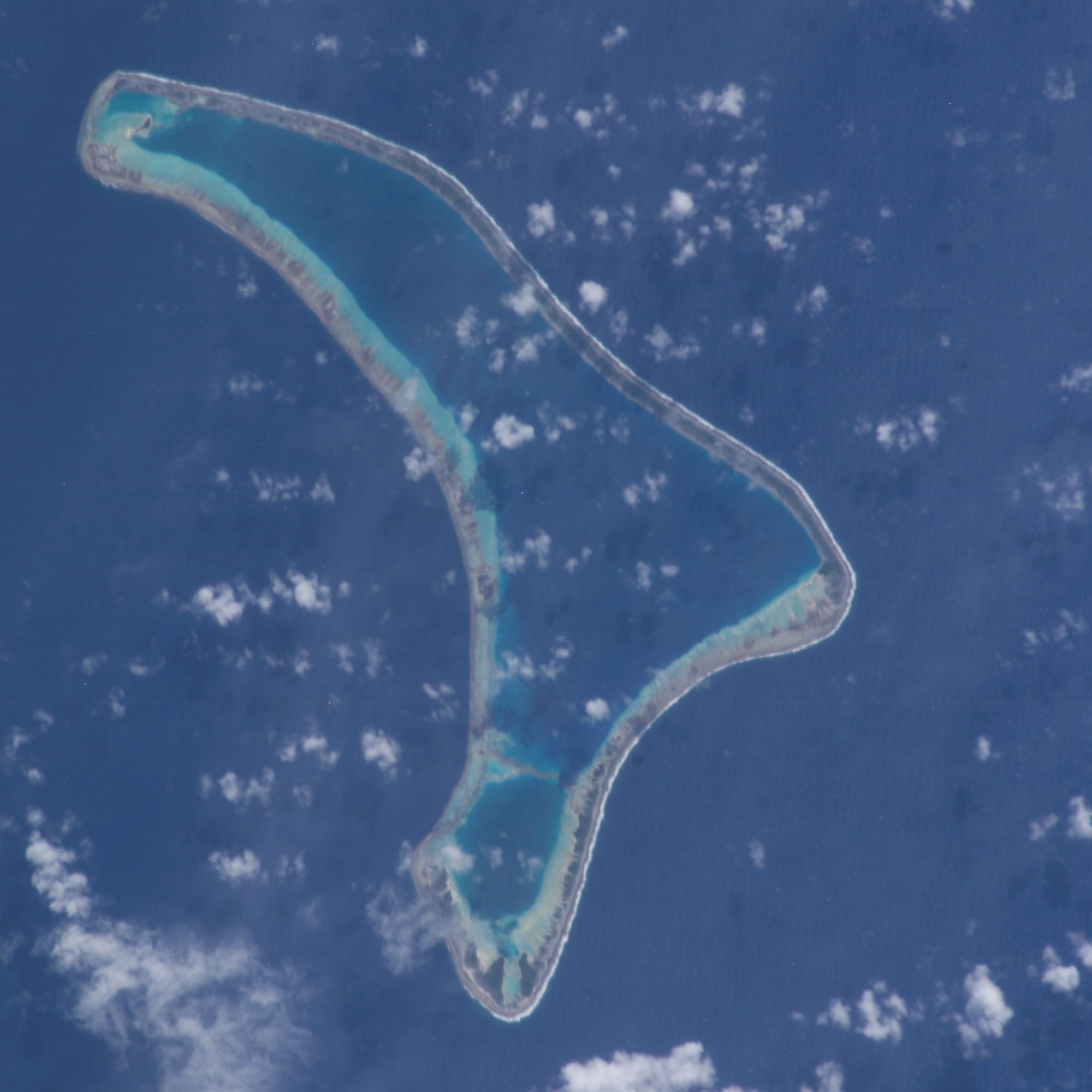
NASA picture of Ravahere atoll

== See also ==
- Desert island
- List of islands
