= Tekokota =

Atoll in French Polynesia

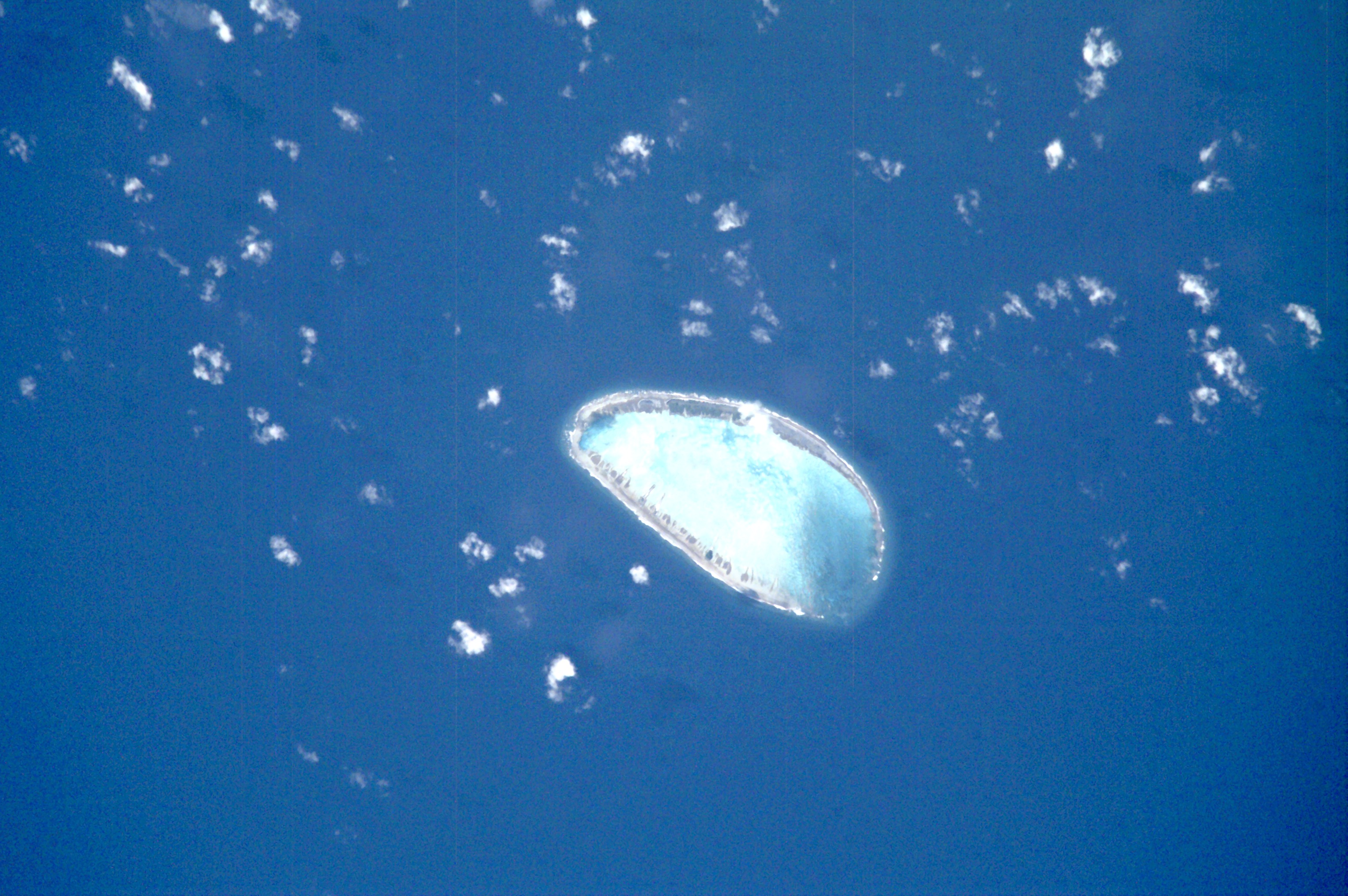
- NASA picture of Tekokota Atoll

- Location within French Polynesia

Geography
- Location: Pacific Ocean
- Coordinates: 17°19′S 142°37′W
- Archipelago: Tuamotus
- Area: 5.1 km^{2} (2.0 sq mi) (lagoon); 0.9 km^{2} (0.3 sq mi) (above water)
- Length: 5 km (3.1 mi)
- Width: 3.5 km (2.17 mi)

Administration
- France
- Overseas collectivity: French Polynesia
- Administrative subdivision: Tuamotus
- Commune: Hikueru

Demographics
- Population: Uninhabited (2012)

Tekokota is one of the Central Tuamotu atolls, located close to the geographic center of the archipelago.

Tekokota Atoll is one of the smallest atolls of the Tuamotus. Its islands have a total land mass of only 0.9 square kilometres (0.3 square miles).

Tekokota's shape is roughly oval and it is 5 kilometres (3 miles) in length and 3.5 kilometres (2.2 miles) in width. The western side of Tekokota Atoll is submerged. The surface of its shallow central lagoon is 5.1 square kilometres (2.0 square miles).

Tekokota Atoll is uninhabited. The closest land to Tekokota is Hikueru Atoll, located 22 km to the south.

== History ==
Tekokota was first sighted by James Cook in 1773. He named Tekokota Atoll "Doubtful".

Months later Spanish explorer José de Andía called this atoll, "La del Peligro" (The Dangerous One). A few days later, another Spanish navigator Domingo de Boenechea sighted Tekokota on ship Aguila. He named this atoll "Los Mártires".

The island is described from the perspective of a castaway from Hikueru in Jack London's short story "The House of Mapuhi" in South Sea Tales (1911).

== Administration ==
Tekokota Atoll belongs to the commune of Hikueru, which consists of the atolls of Hikueru, Marokau, Ravahere, Reitoru and Tekokota.

== See also ==
- Desert island
- List of islands
