= The Heathen =

- Short story by Jack London
- Country: United States
- Language: English
- Genre: Short story

Publication
- Published in: Everybody's Magazine
- Publication type: Magazine
- Publication date: 1910

"The Heathen" is a short story by the American writer Jack London. It was first published in Everybody's Magazine in August 1910, and later included in collections of stories by London, South Sea Tales, published by Macmillan in 1911, and The Strength of the Strong, published by Macmillan in 1914.

In the story, two people, from different cultural and racial backgrounds, are the only survivors of a ship that encounters a hurricane in the Pacific, and they remain together.

== Background ==
In 1907 London began a voyage across the Pacific Ocean in his ketch the Snark, and visited islands in the south Pacific, concluding the voyage in Sydney, Australia. He wrote about the adventure in his book The Cruise of the Snark. "The Heathen" is set among islands that London visited during that period.

== Plot summary ==
The narrator, a pearl buyer named Charley, is a cabin passenger on a schooner, the Petite Jeanne, sailing from Rangiroa to Tahiti with a Kanaka crew, at the end of the pearling season in the Paumotas. The boat, having eighty-five deck passengers, is overloaded. Several passengers die of smallpox; Charley and the other cabin passengers drink whisky, until it runs out, in the belief that it will kill the smallpox germs.

The boat is in the direct path of a hurricane. "The second sea filled the Petite Jeanne's decks flush with the rails, and, as her stern sank down and her bow tossed skyward, all the miserable dunnage of life and luggage poured aft. It was a human torrent.... Out of all my experiences I could not have believed it possible for the wind to blow as it did.... It was a monstrous thing, and the most monstrous thing about it was that it increased and continued to increase."

The Petite Jeanne is destroyed in the hurricane, and Charley survives by clinging to a hatch cover from the boat, sharing it with a Kanaka named Otoo. Eventually Charley loses consciousness, and comes to on the beach of an atoll; Otoo has saved his life by pulling him from the water. They are the only survivors from the Petite Jeanne.

They exchange names. "In the South Seas such a ceremony binds two men closer together than blood-brothership." They part in Papeete and Otoo goes home to Bora Bora; but he returns, because his wife has died. He accompanies Charley for the next seventeen years, ensuring that he does not come to harm.

"Truly, he made me a better man. Yet he was not strait-laced. And he knew nothing of common Christian morality.... he was a heathen... a gross materialist who believed that when he died he was dead. He believed merely in fair play and square-dealing.... Otoo had my welfare always at heart. He thought ahead for me, weighed my plans and took a greater interest in them than I did myself."

Otoo advises Charley to become a captain of a schooner, in order to save enough to own a plantation. He does so; he marries and has children. Otoo helps to bring up the children on the plantation.

The relationship ends when Otoo is killed saving Charley from sharks on the coast of Savu. "And so passed Otoo, who saved me and made me a man, and who saved me in the end."

== Commentary ==
In a 2006 collection of stories by London including "The Heathen", the editors comment: "In the early 1940s, when this story found its way into fiction anthologies and high school textbooks, it was admired for its fiercely detailed picture of a storm at sea and for its courageous examination of a friendship that transcended cultural and racial differences.... It is nowadays impossible for us to read the account of the friendship between Charley and Otoo so simply.... By the 1970s, as editors began to see the complexity of the ideas about race embedded in "The Heathen", it simply became easier to drop the story from collections altogether." It is noteworthy, for example, that the two friends are involved for much of their career in Blackbirding and feel no moral compunction about this activity, and that the term "nigger" is repeatedly used throughout the story.
