= Paraoa =

Atoll in French Polynesia

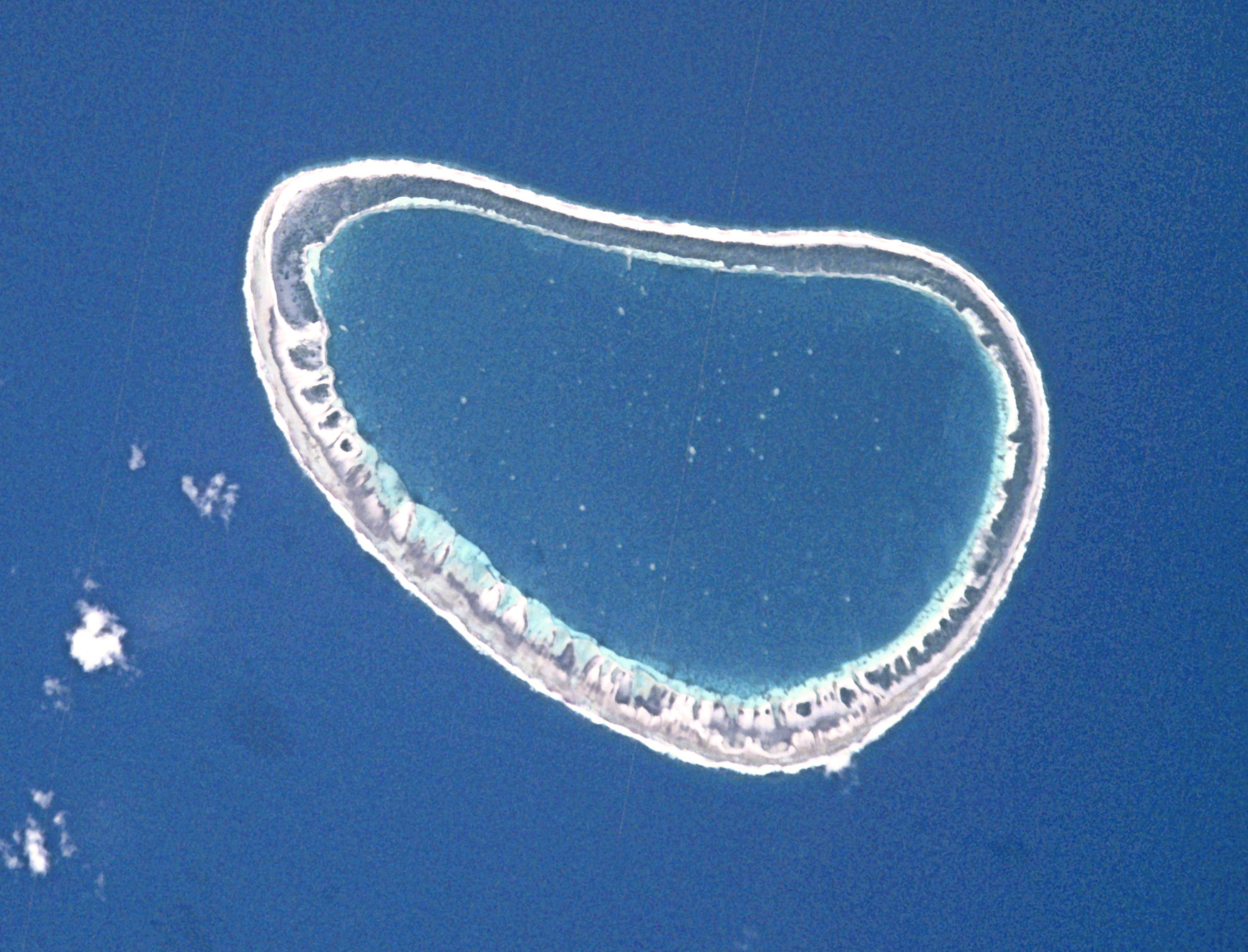
- NASA picture of Paraoa Atoll

- Location within French Polynesia

Geography
- Location: Pacific Ocean
- Coordinates: 19°08′S 140°43′W
- Archipelago: Tuamotus
- Area: 14 km^{2} (5.4 sq mi) (lagoon); 4 km^{2} (1.5 sq mi) (above water)
- Length: 8.5 km (5.28 mi)
- Width: 5.5 km (3.42 mi)

Administration
- France
- Overseas collectivity: French Polynesia
- Administrative subdivision: Îles Tuamotu-Gambier
- Commune: Hao

Demographics
- Population: Uninhabited (2012)

Paraoa, Tohora, or Hariri is a small atoll of the central Tuamotu Archipelago in French Polynesia. It is located 76 km south of Hao Atoll's westernmost point. The closest land is Manuhangi Atoll, 52 km to the west.

Paraoa Atoll is ovular in shape. It measures 8.5 kilometres (5.3 miles) in length with a maximum width of 5.5 kilometres (3.4 miles). Its lagoon is not connected to the ocean by a pass, which makes this small atoll quite inaccessible. Paraoa Atoll is uninhabited.

== History ==
The first recorded European who arrived to Paraoa was Englishman Samuel Wallis in 1767. He named it "Gloucester".

== Administration ==
Paraoa belongs to the commune of Hao (Main village: Otepa), which includes also Ahunui (uninhabited), Nengonengo, and Manuhangi (uninhabited).
