= Amanu =

Atoll in French Polynesia

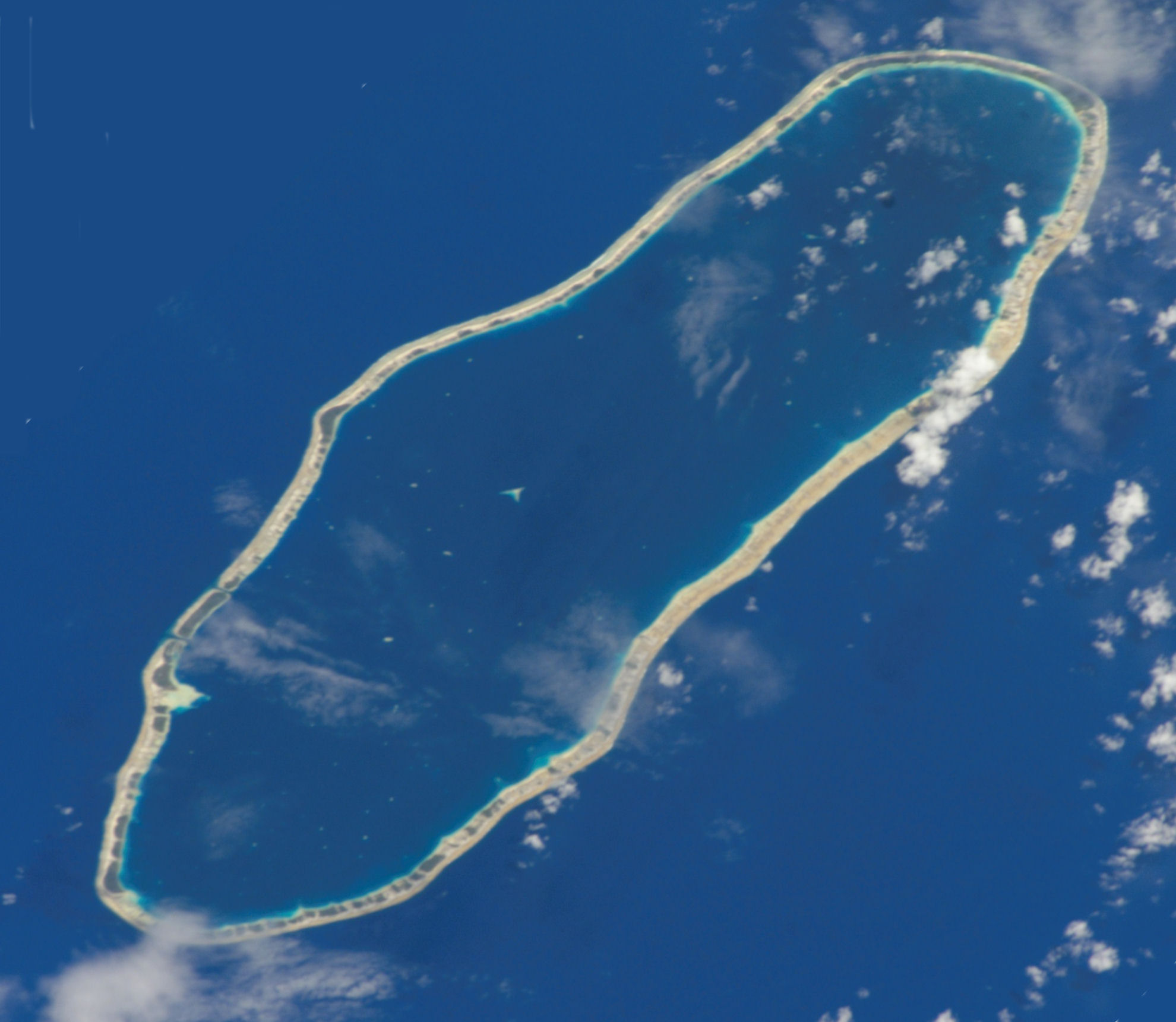
- NASA picture of Amanu Atoll

- Location within French Polynesia

Geography
- Location: Pacific Ocean
- Coordinates: 17°48′22″S 140°45′39″W
- Archipelago: Tuamotus
- Area: 240 km^{2} (93 sq mi)(lagoon); 15.55 km^{2} (6 sq mi) (above water)
- Length: 32 km (19.9 mi)
- Width: 10 km (6 mi)

Administration
- France
- Overseas collectivity: French Polynesia
- Administrative subdivision: Îles Tuamotu-Gambier
- Commune: Hao
- Largest settlement: Ikitake

Demographics
- Population: 192 (2012)
- Pop. density: 20/km^{2} (50/sq mi)

Amanu, Timanu, or Karere, is an atoll in the Tuamotu archipelago. Amanu lies at right angles to neighbouring Hao Atoll; this orientation is quite rare for the Tuamotu atolls.

It is situated 900 km east of Tahiti and 15 km north of Hao. The atoll is 32 km long (northeast to southwest) and 10 km wide, but only 15.55 km^{2} of its land is above water, the rest forming the central lagoon. The surface area of Amanu's wide lagoon is 240 km^{2}. There are two navigable passes to enter it.

Amanu has 195 inhabitants. The main village is Ikitake.

== History ==
The first recorded European who arrived at Amanu Atoll was Portuguese navigator Pedro Fernández de Quirós who navigated for Spain, on 12 February 1606, while sailing across the Pacific Ocean in search of Terra Australis. However, several 16th-century Spanish cannons were found on Amanu in 1929, indicating that an earlier Spanish expedition had visited Tuamotu. Some historians notably Robert Adrian Langdon believe the cannons belonged to the caravel San Lesmes, which was split off from the Loaísa expedition which sailed the Pacific Ocean in 1526.

It was later visited by Spanish explorer Domingo de Boenechea in 1774, that charted them as Las Ánimas (The Souls in Spanish).

Russian explorer Fabian Gottlieb von Bellingshausen visited Amanu in 1820 on ships Vostok and Mirni. He named this atoll "Moller".

== Administration ==
Administratively Amanu forms a commune in French Polynesia which includes the atolls of Rekareka (uninhabited) and Tauere. The Amanu commune is associated with the Hao commune.
