= Manuhangi =

Atoll in French Polynesia

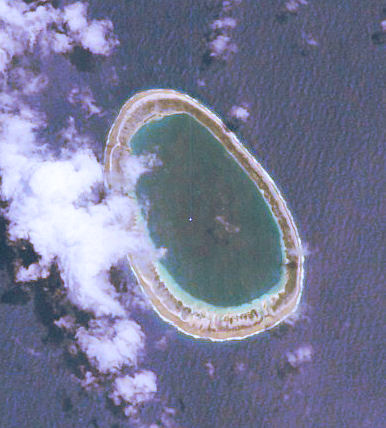
- NASA picture of Manuhangi Atoll

- Location within French Polynesia

Geography
- Location: Pacific Ocean
- Coordinates: 19°14′S 141°15′W
- Archipelago: Tuamotus
- Area: 7 km^{2} (2.7 sq mi) (lagoon); 3.75 km^{2} (1.45 sq mi) (above sea level)
- Length: 5.4 km (3.36 mi)
- Width: 3.6 km (2.24 mi)

Administration
- France
- Overseas collectivity: French Polynesia
- Administrative subdivision: Tuamotus
- Commune: Hao

Demographics
- Population: Uninhabited (2012)

Manuhangi (also known as Te Fara) is an atoll of the Tuamotu Archipelago in French Polynesia. It is located 68 km southeast of Nengonengo, 52 km west of Paraoa and 845 km east of Tahiti.

Manuhangi Atoll is small in size, with a length of 5.4 km and a maximum width of 3.6 km. It has an oval shape and a coral reef completely enclosing a small lagoon. Manuhangi has a hook-shaped island covering the east and northeast of its reef.

== History ==
NASA picture of Manuhangi atoll

The old Paumotu (Tuamotu's inhabitants) called this small atoll "manu hagi" (meaning "the loving bird"). The atoll has been uninhabited for many years.

The first recorded European who arrived to Manuhangi was English navigator Samuel Wallis in 1767. He named it "Cumberland".

== Administration ==
Administratively Manuhangi belongs to the commune of Hao (main village: Otepa), which includes Ahunui (uninhabited), Nengonengo, Manuhangi (no permanent inhabitant) and Paraoa (uninhabited).

== Flora and fauna ==
Manuhangi is a protected area and various species of birds are found in the atoll. Part of the land is planted with coconut palms. Apart from the birds, the fauna of the island primarily consists of coconut crabs.

== Economy and infrastructure ==
Tahitian black pearls are collected and cultivated in the surrounding islands. The island has some houses with permanent structures, cisterns, and water supply from natural wells. Manuhangi has no permanent inhabitant.
