= Marokau =

Atoll in French Polynesia

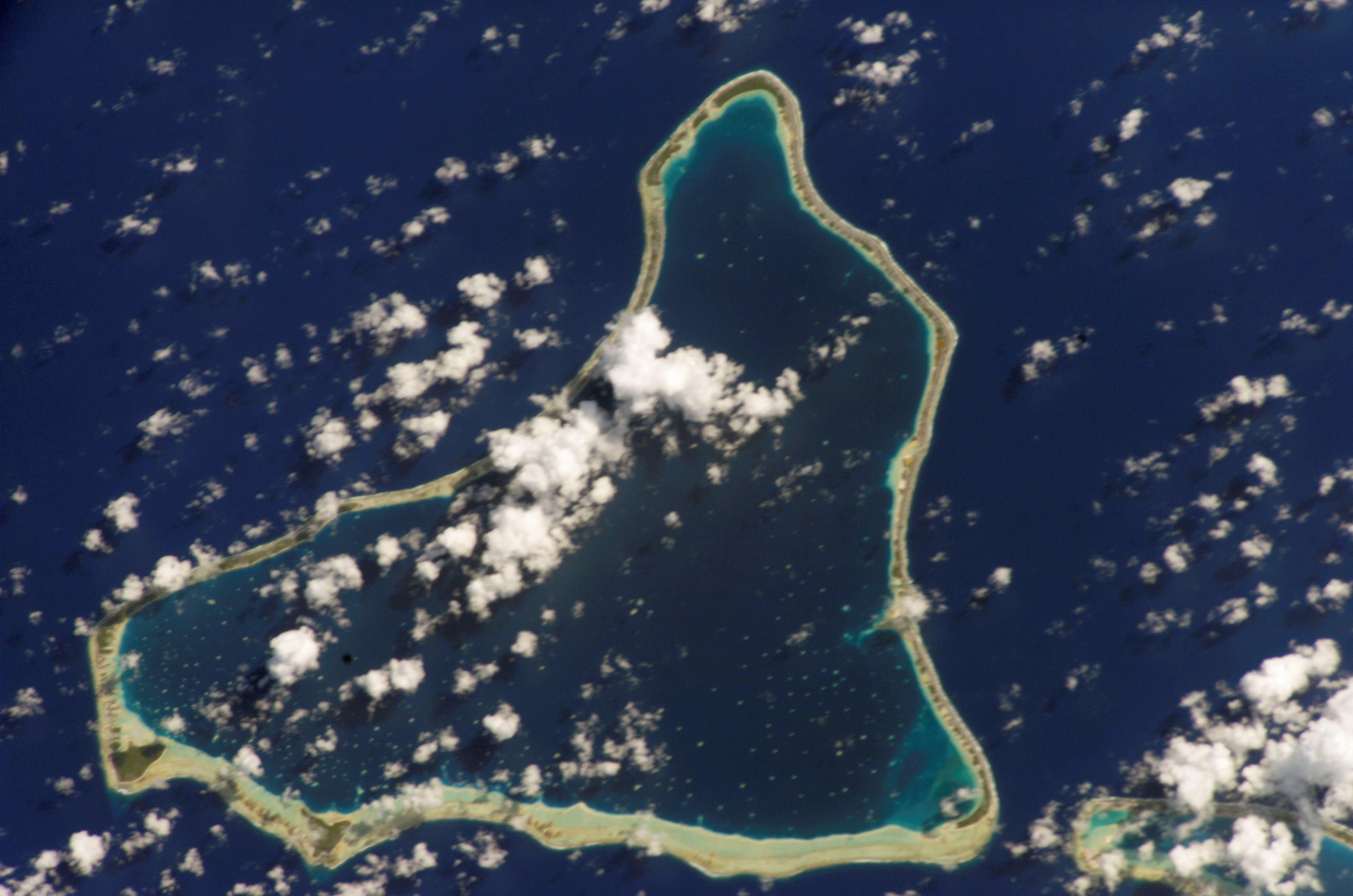
- NASA picture of Marokau Atoll

- Location within French Polynesia

Geography
- Location: Pacific Ocean
- Coordinates: 18°04′S 142°16′W
- Archipelago: Tuamotus
- Area: 215.6 km^{2} (83.2 sq mi) (lagoon); 14.7 km^{2} (5.7 sq mi) (above water)
- Length: 22 km (13.7 mi)

Administration
- France
- Overseas collectivity: French Polynesia
- Administrative subdivision: Îles Tuamotu-Gambier
- Commune: Hikueru
- Largest settlement: Vaiori

Demographics
- Population: 91 (2012)

Marokau is an atoll of the Tuamotu Archipelago in French Polynesia. It lies 53 km southeast of Hikueru Atoll and it is separated by a 2 km wide sound from Ravahere, its closest neighbor in the south.

Marokau and Ravahere form a minor subgroup of the Tuamotus known as the Two Groups Islands.

Marokau Atoll is roughly triangular. The islands on its reef have a combined land area of 14.7 km^{2}. The shallow lagoon has a surface of 215.6 km^{2}.

Marokau has 91 inhabitants. Most live in Vaiori, the main village, located on an island at its northern end. The locals collect copra from the numerous coconut palms planted on the islands and motus. There is another small village called Topitike in its south-eastern corner.

== History ==
The first recorded European who sighted the two neighboring atolls of Marokau and Ravahere was Louis Antoine de Bougainville in 1768.

Marokau Atoll was one of the main locations in the Tuamotu lagoons at which pearls were collected from the nineteenth century up to 1965.

The atoll was heavily hit by a cyclone in 1903 which caused the death of 95 people.

== Administration ==
Marokau Atoll belongs to the commune of Hikueru, which consists of the atolls of Marokau, Hikueru, Ravahere, Reitoru and Tekokota.

== Additional images ==
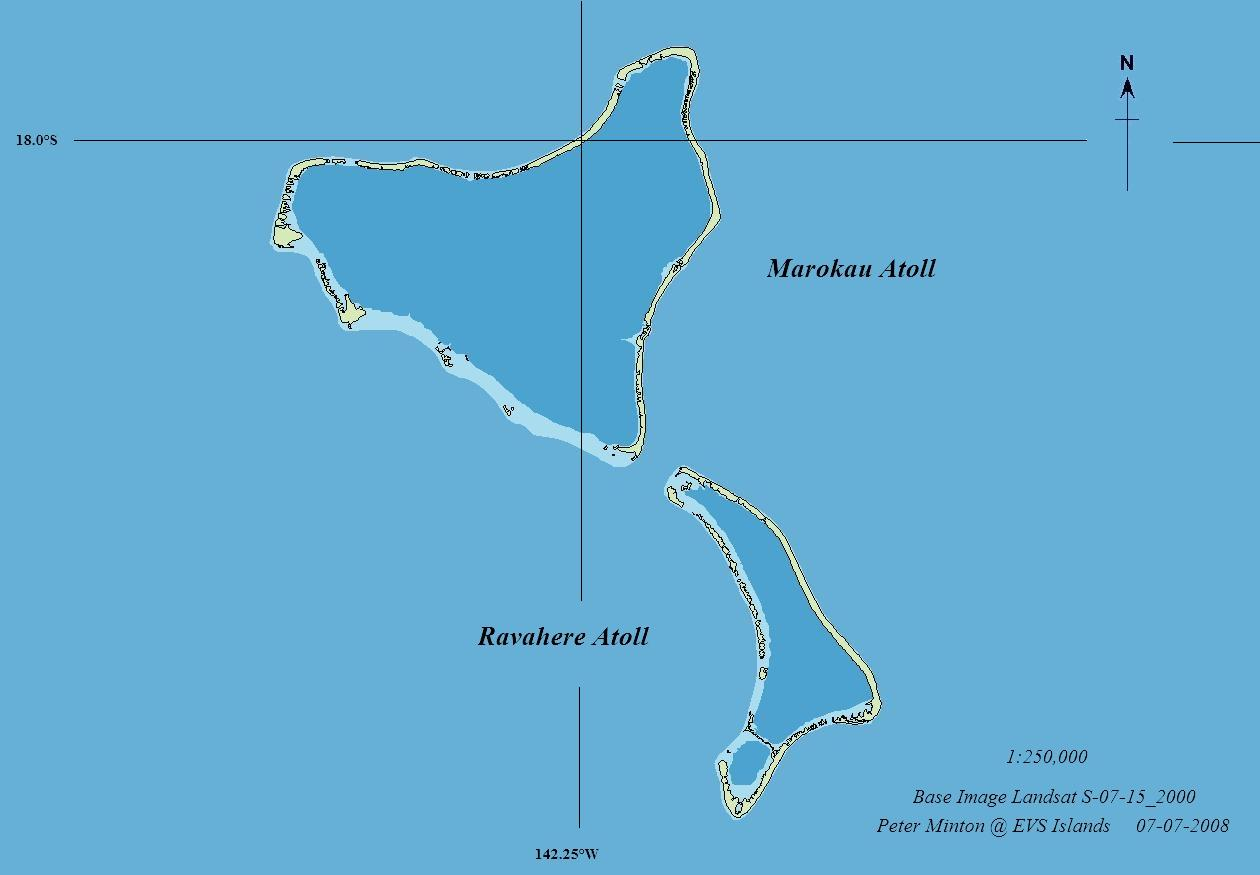
Marokau and Ravahere Atolls

NASA picture of Marokau Atoll; note Ravahere's northern tip on the lower right corner.
