= Tauere =

Atoll in French Polynesia

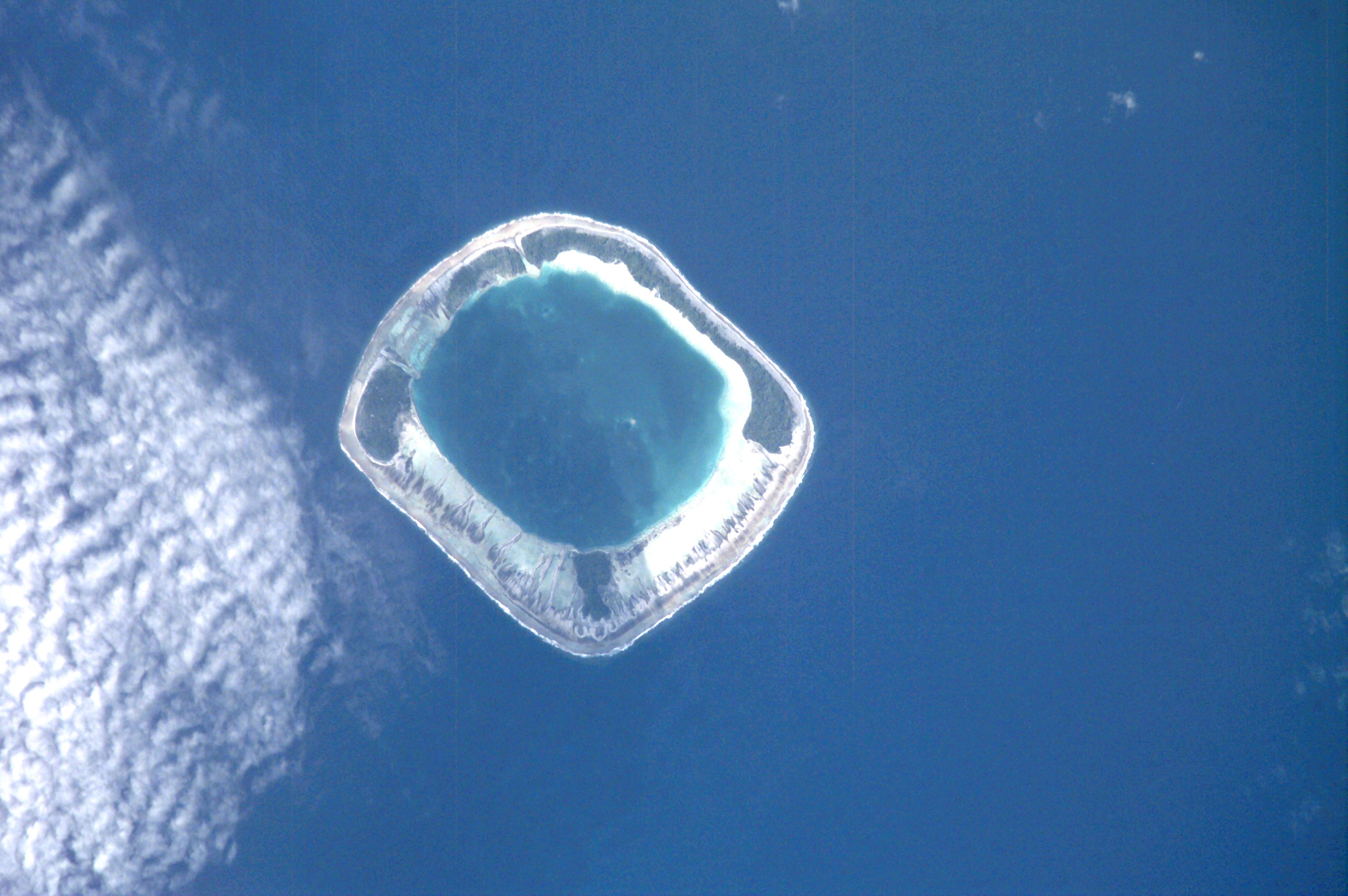
- NASA picture of Tauere Atoll

- Location within French Polynesia

Geography
- Location: Pacific Ocean
- Coordinates: 17°22′S 141°28′W
- Archipelago: Tuamotus
- Area: 60 km^{2} (23 sq mi) (lagoon); 3.9 km^{2} (1.5 sq mi) (above water)
- Length: 7.5 km (4.66 mi)

Administration
- France
- Overseas collectivity: French Polynesia
- Administrative subdivision: Tuamotus
- Commune: Hao

Demographics
- Population: 3 (2012)

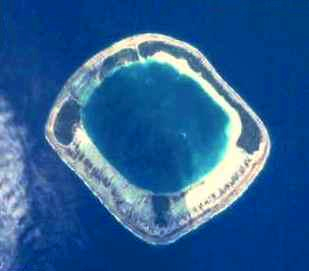
NASA picture of Tauere Atoll.

Tauere Atoll or Taouere, also known as Te Putua, is a small atoll of the central Tuamotu Archipelago in French Polynesia. It is located 85 kilometres (53 miles) northwest of Hao Atoll's westernmost point.

Tauere Atoll is squarish in shape. It measures 7.5 kilometres (4.7 miles) across. The islands are located on its northern and eastern sides. Its lagoon is not connected to the ocean by a pass, which makes this small atoll quite inaccessible.

Tauere has only 3 inhabitants. In 2007 it had 7 inhabitants.

== History ==
The first European recorded sight of the atoll was by the Spanish expedition of Pedro Fernandez de Quirós on 12 February 1606. They charted it as La Decena. Tauere was again sighted by Spanish navigator Domingo de Boenechea on October 28, 1772 on the ship Aguila. He sailed from Callao on September 26, 1772, to establish a colony on Tahiti. He called this atoll San Simon y Judas. Hence this atoll appears in some maps as St. Simon.

== Administration ==
Administratively Tauere belongs to the commune of Amanu (Main village: Ikitake) which includes the atolls of Rekareka (uninhabited) and Tauere. The Amanu commune is associated with the Hao commune.
