= Rekareka =

Atoll in French Polynesia

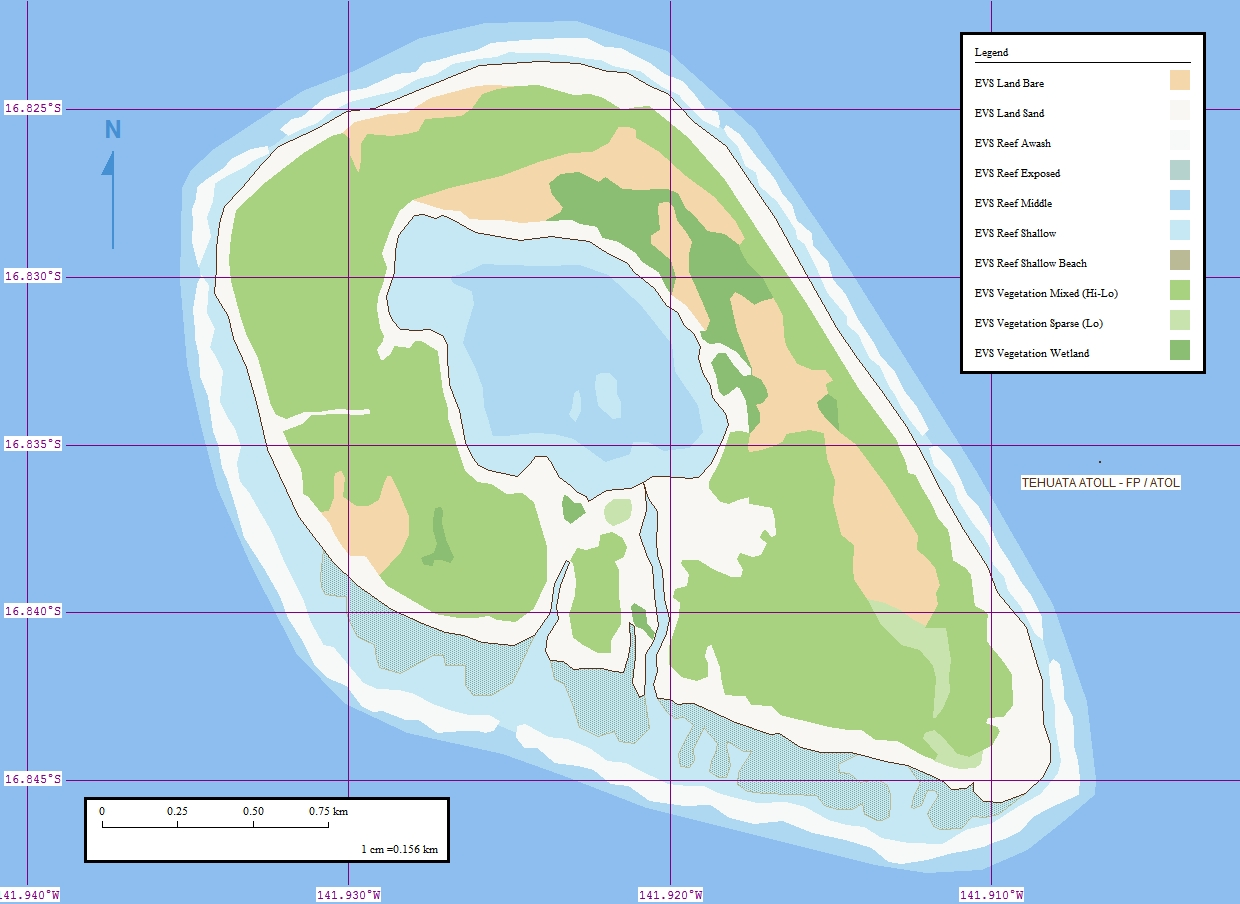
- Map of Rekareka Atoll

- Location within French Polynesia

Geography
- Location: Pacific Ocean
- Coordinates: 16°49′S 141°55′W
- Archipelago: Tuamotus
- Area: 2.5 km^{2} (0.97 sq mi) (lagoon); 3.31 km^{2} (1.3 sq mi) (above water)
- Length: 2.2 km (1.37 mi)
- Width: 1.25 km (0.777 mi)

Administration
- France
- Overseas collectivity: French Polynesia
- Administrative subdivision: Tuamotus
- Commune: Hao

Demographics
- Population: Uninhabited (2012)

Rekareka, Tehuata or Tu-henua, is an atoll of the Tuamotu Archipelago in French Polynesia. It is located in the Centre East of the group, 83 km southeast from Raroia, and lies 70 km NW of Tauere, its nearest neighbor. The shoal water of this small atoll extends 0.8 km seaward from its northern, western, and southern sides, and about 1.3 km from its south-eastern side. Rekareka has no fresh water and is uninhabited.

== History ==
Portuguese explorer serving the Spanish Crown Pedro Fernandes de Queirós sighted Rekareka during his Pacific expedition on February 13, 1606. The Spaniards named this island "La Sagitaria" and reported that it was inhabited at that time. In some maps this island also appears as "Bonne Esperance" and "Good Hope".

== Administration ==
Administratively Rekareka belongs to the commune of Amanu which includes the atolls of Rekareka (uninhabited) and Tauere. The Amanu commune is associated with the Hao commune.

== See also ==
- Desert island
- List of islands
