= Ahunui =

Atoll in French Polynesia

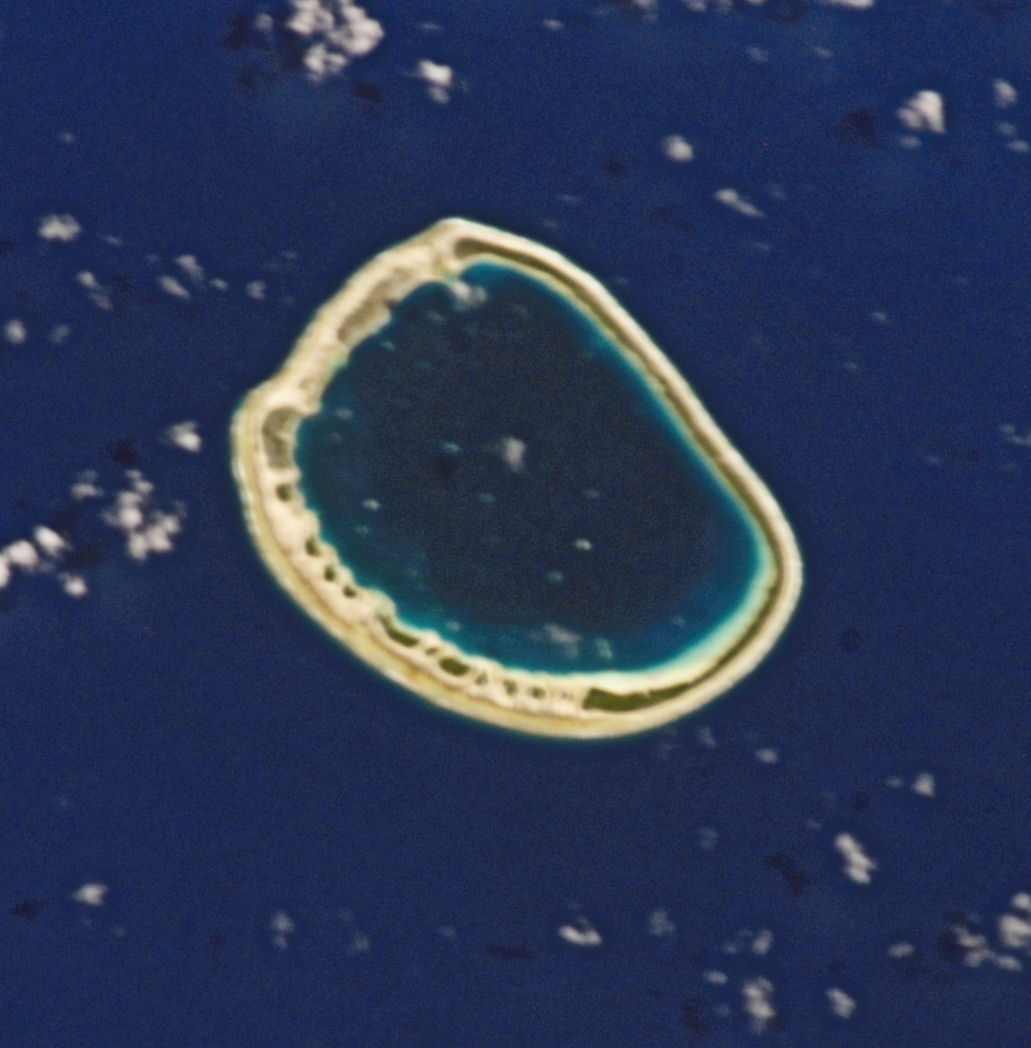
- NASA picture of Ahunui Atoll

- Location within French Polynesia

Geography
- Location: Pacific Ocean
- Coordinates: 19°37′S 140°23′W
- Archipelago: Tuamotus
- Area: 34 km^{2} (13 sq mi)(lagoon); 5.4 km^{2} (2 sq mi) (above water)
- Width: 6.5 km (4.04 mi)

Administration
- France
- Overseas collectivity: French Polynesia
- Administrative subdivision: Îles Tuamotu-Gambier
- Commune: Hao

Demographics
- Population: Uninhabited (2012)

Ahunui or Nga-taumanga is a small atoll of the eastern Tuamotu Archipelago in French Polynesia. It is located 55 km SSE of Paraoa Atoll and 120 km WSW of Vairaatea.

Ahunui Atoll is roughly circular in shape and measures 6.5 km in diameter. It has a land area of approximately 5.4 km^{2} and a lagoon area of 34 km^{2}. Its lagoon is totally encircled by the reef, so that it is not connected to the ocean by a pass. The islands have coconut plantations on them.

Ahunui Atoll is permanently uninhabited, but it is visited occasionally by neighboring islanders. The rarer pipi oysters (Pinctada maculata) are found in its lagoon.

== History ==
The first recorded European who arrived to Ahunui Atoll was British mariner Frederick William Beechey. He named it "Byam Martin" after Admiral of the Fleet Sir Thomas Byam Martin.

== Administration ==
Ahunui belongs to the commune of Hao (Main village: Otepa), which includes Ahunui (uninhabited), Nengonengo, Manuhangi (uninhabited) and Paraoa (uninhabited).

== See also ==
- Desert island
- List of islands
