= Nengonengo =

Atoll in French Polynesia

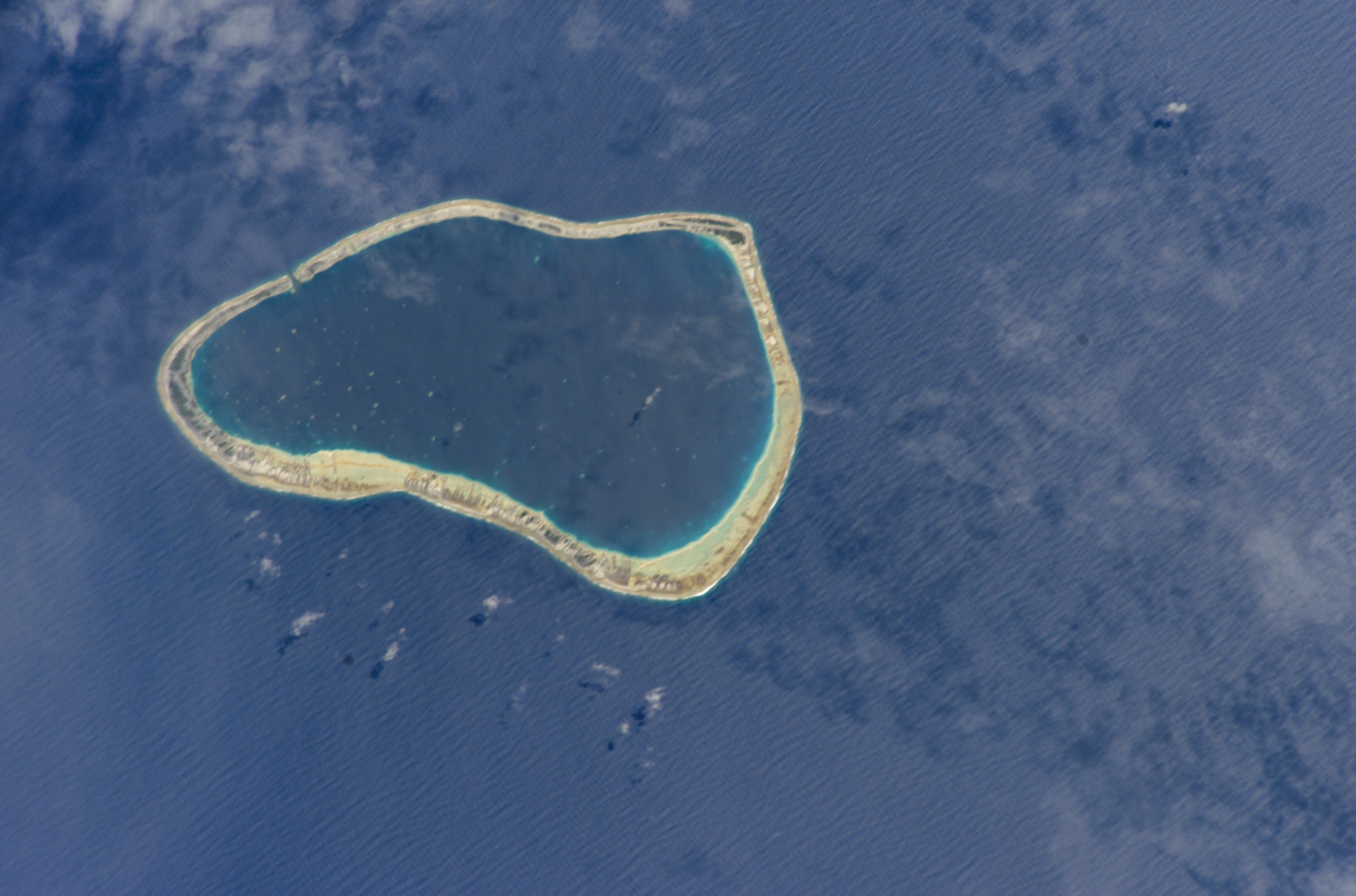
- NASA picture of Nengonengo Atoll

- Location within French Polynesia

Geography
- Location: Pacific Ocean
- Coordinates: 18°46′S 141°48′W
- Archipelago: Tuamotus
- Area: 67 km^{2} (26 sq mi) (lagoon); 9 km^{2} (3.5 sq mi) (above water)
- Length: 13 km (8.1 mi)
- Width: 8 km (5 mi)

Administration
- France
- Overseas collectivity: French Polynesia
- Administrative subdivision: Tuamotus
- Commune: Hao

Demographics
- Population: 54 (2012)

Nengonengo is a small atoll of the Tuamotu Archipelago in French Polynesia. It is located 53 km southeast of Ravahere, its closest neighbor, and 100 km southwest of Hao Atoll.

Nengonengo Atoll is roughly bell-shaped. It measures 13 km in length with a maximum width of 8 km. It has a wide lagoon with a surface 67 km^{2}. There is a narrow pass to enter the lagoon on the north side, but no charted data appears to be available.

In August 1952, W.I.B. Crealock, in the Brixham Trawler Arthur Rogers, captained by Tom Hepworth, reported a pass into the lagoon. Hepworth attempted entrance but was temporarily hung up in the shallow pass requiring use of a winch to gain entry into the lagoon. William Ion Belton Crealock was a sailor, sailing navigator, yacht designer, and author. He was one of the world's leading yacht designers from the 1960s through the 1990s.

Once anchored in the lagoon, Hepworth took soundings in the pass. As reported by Crealock (1955:205-207):

"For the next three days we surveyed the pass from the dingy, working during the few hours of slack water; we had learned by now that in normal weather the current in these lagoons will slacken off towards high and low water, and that there might even be a slight in-going current for an hour or so. Three of us were needed for these sounding operations, one to row the dingy, one to work the lead line, and the third to see, from underwater, that the lead missed no irregularities in the bottom. We were working not in feet but with inches. The bed of the pass, we discovered, was smoothed by the current, with coral growths no larger than cabbages on gently undulating slopes."

Tom Hepworth discovered that there was no straight path through the pass with more than 6 feet of water.in the Admiralty Pilot available in 1952, depth of the pass was reported at 6 fathoms instead of 6 feet, with the pass reported on the eastern rather than northern side of the reef. There is a non-navigable pass on the eastern side. Hepworth anchored adjacent to the beach in the northwest corner of the lagoon. The Aurther Rogers possessed an 8-foot draft, and to close the gap between pass depth and boat draft, they waited 10 days for spring tides, which increased pass depth, and then altered the trim of the boat. They eventually found a channel through the pass carrying 7.5 feet, and were able to escape the lagoon.

Nengonengo has a very small population, and is actually occupied exclusively by the pearl farms belonging to Mr. R. Wan.

== History ==
The first recorded European who arrived to Nengonengo was Englishman Samuel Wallis in 1767. He named it "Prince William Henry".

The small private airport on Nengonengo was inaugurated in 1993. It is owned by the Wan pearl company.

== Administration ==
Nengonengo Atoll belongs to the commune of Hao, which includes Ahunui (uninhabited), Nengonengo, Manuhangi (uninhabited) and Paraoa (uninhabited).
