= Reitoru =

Atoll in French Polynesia

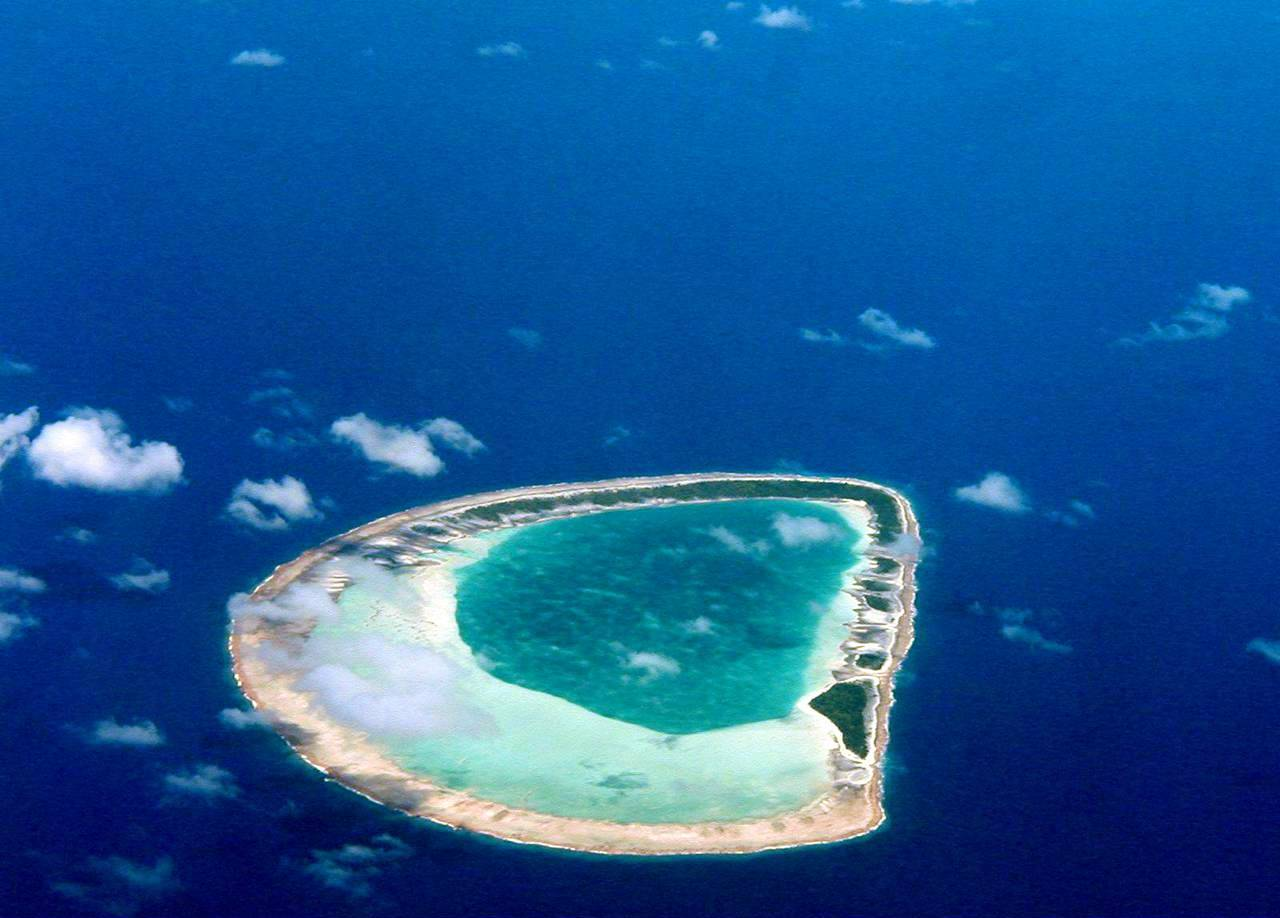

- Location within French Polynesia

Geography
- Location: Pacific Ocean
- Coordinates: 17°52′S 143°5′W
- Archipelago: Tuamotus
- Area: 6 km^{2} (2.3 sq mi) (lagoon); 1.4 km^{2} (1 sq mi) (above water)
- Length: 5 km (3.1 mi)
- Width: 3 km (1.9 mi)

Administration
- France
- Overseas collectivity: French Polynesia
- Administrative subdivision: Tuamotus
- Commune: Hikueru

Demographics
- Population: Uninhabited (2012)

Reitoru, or Te Pirehi, is a small atoll of the Tuamotu Archipelago in French Polynesia. It is located in center of the archipelago, 50 km southwest of Hikueru.

The inner lagoon is closed and is inaccessible from the ocean. The total surface area is 1.39 km^{2}. The island is inhabited by a small number of people who live by farming pearls and gathering copra.

== History ==
The first recorded European who arrived to Reitoru Atoll was French Louis Antoine de Bougainville in 1768. The following year, James Cook called the island "Bird Island", because the birds were the only inhabitants found.

During the 19th and 20th century, Reitoru was an important center for pearl divers. In 1903, the atoll was devastated by a cyclone, causing the death of approximately one hundred people.

== Administration ==
Administratively Reitoru belongs to the commune of Hikueru, which consists of the atolls of Hikueru, Marokau, Ravahere, Reitoru, and Tekokota.
