= South Sea Tales (London collection) =

Book by Jack London

- First edition
- Author: Jack London
- Language: English
- Publisher: Macmillan
- Publication date: 1911
- Publication place: United States
- Pages: 327

South Sea Tales (1911) is a collection of short stories written by Jack London. Most stories are set in island communities, like those of Hawaii, or are set aboard a ship.

== List of Stories ==
- The House of Mapuhi
- The Whale Tooth
- Mauki
- "Yah! Yah! Yah!"
- The Heathen
- The Terrible Solomons
- The Inevitable White Man
- The Seed of McCoy

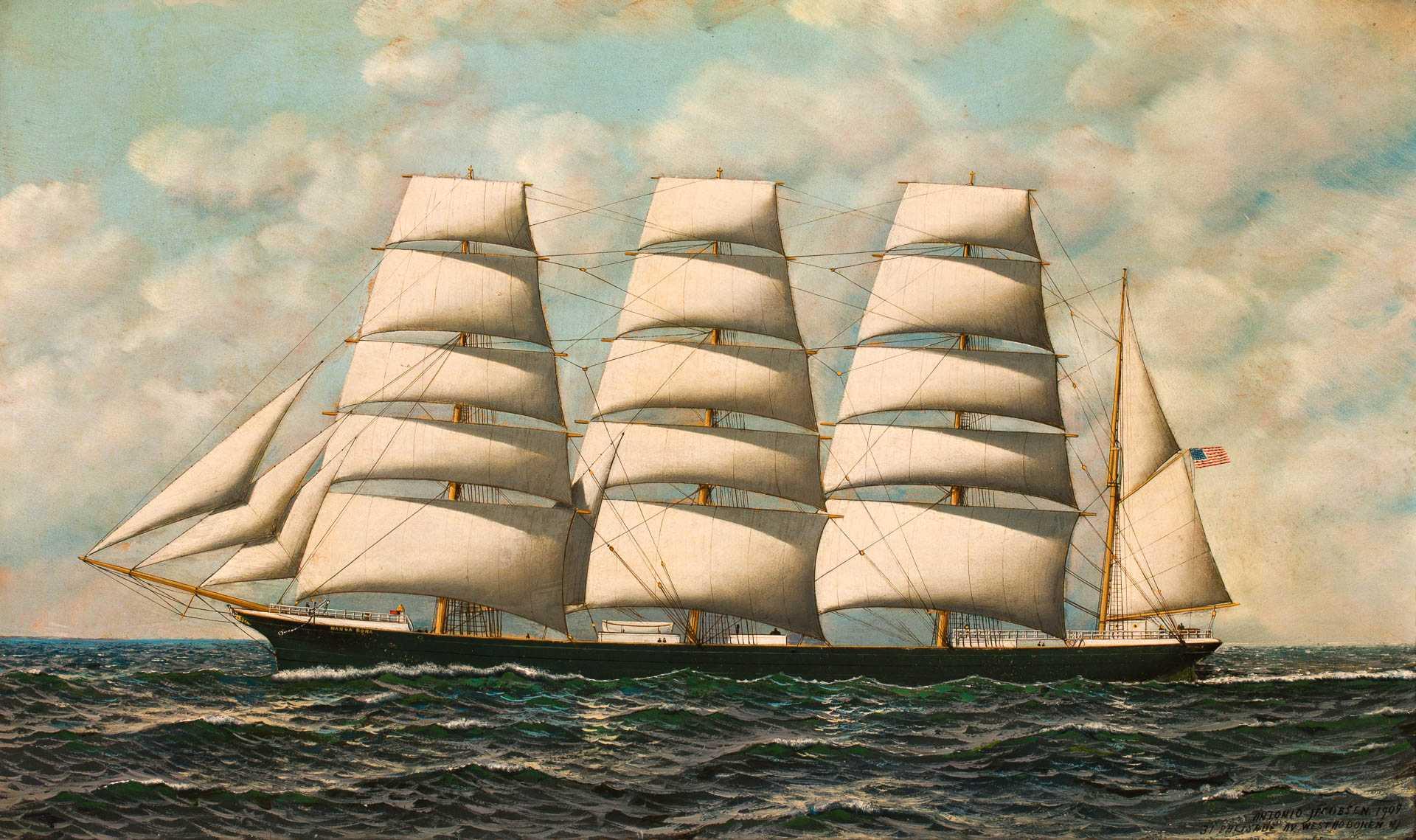
The Pyrenees a bark whose story inspired The Seed of McCoy
