= Hao (French Polynesia) =

Atoll in French Polynesia

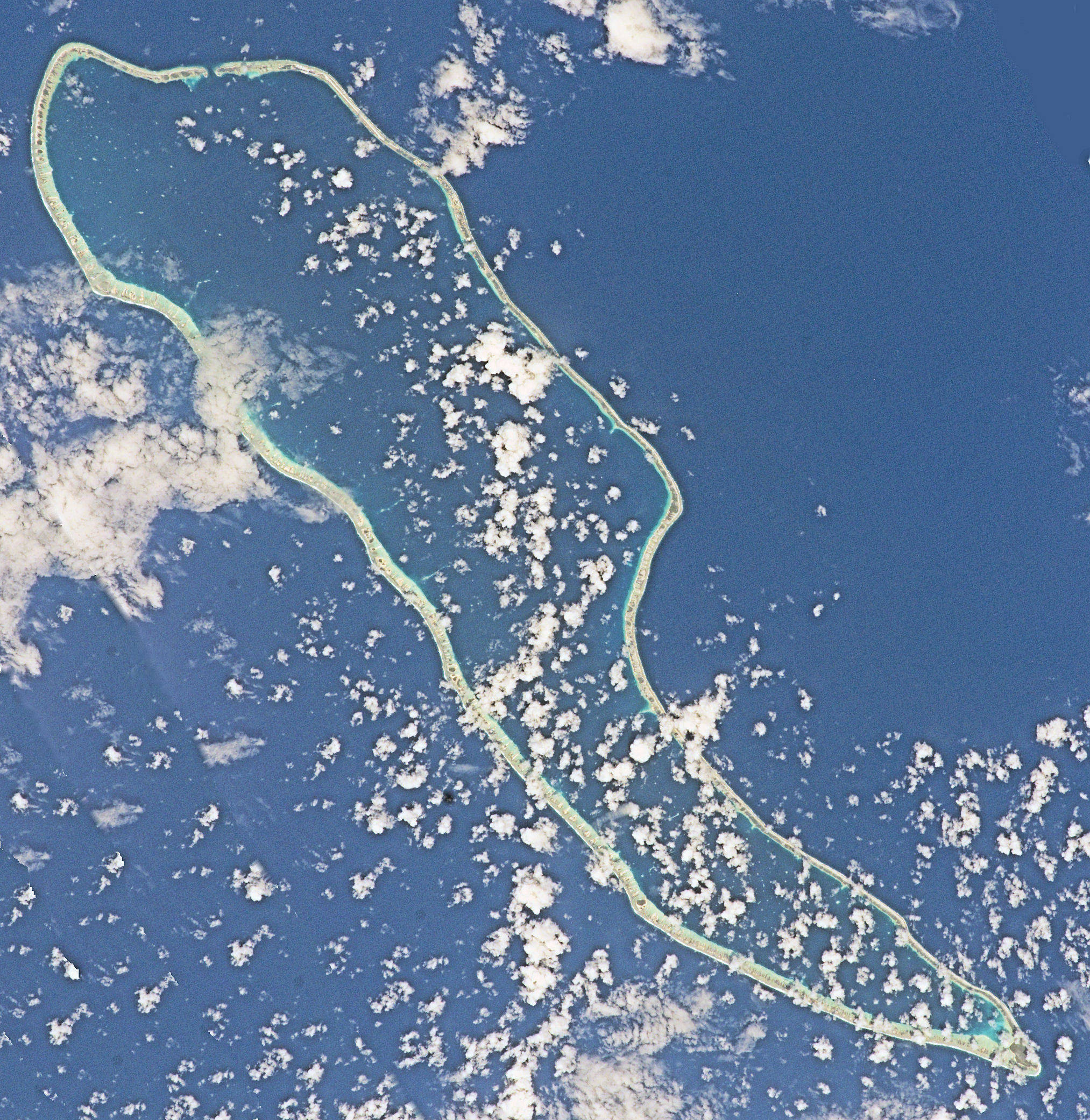
- NASA picture of Hao Atoll

- Location within French Polynesia

Geography
- Location: Pacific Ocean
- Coordinates: 18°4′31″S 140°56′43″W
- Archipelago: Tuamotus
- Area: 720 km^{2} (280 sq mi) (lagoon); 35 km^{2} (14 sq mi) (above water)
- Length: 50 km (31 mi)
- Width: 14 km (8.7 mi)
- Highest elevation: 3 m (10 ft)

Administration
- France
- Overseas collectivity: French Polynesia
- Administrative subdivision: Îles Tuamotu-Gambier
- Commune: Hao
- Largest settlement: Otepa

Demographics
- Population: 1009 (2022)

Hao
- Commune
- Flag

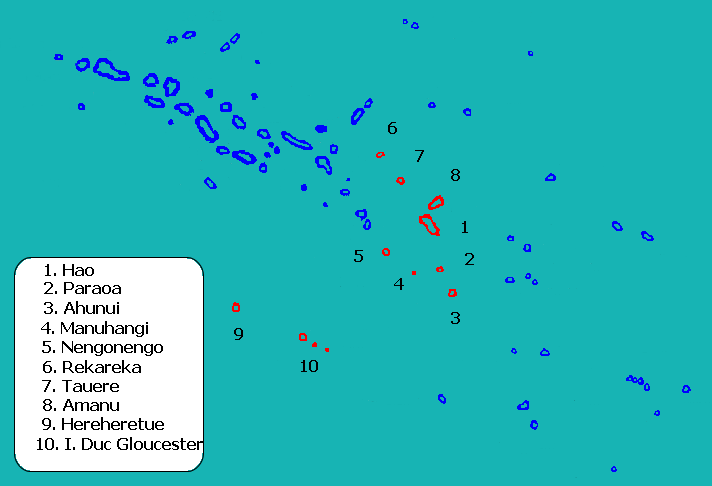
- Location of Hao
- Coordinates: 18°04′31″S 140°56′43″W
- Country: France
- Overseas collectivity: French Polynesia
- Subdivision: Îles Tuamotu-Gambier

Government
  - Mayor (2020–2026): Yseult Butcher
- Area^{1}: 65.0 km^{2} (25.1 sq mi)
- Highest elevation: 3 m (9.8 ft)
- Lowest elevation: 0 m (0 ft)
- Population (2022): 1,227
  - Density: 18.9/km^{2} (48.9/sq mi)
- Time zone: UTC−10:00
- INSEE/Postal code: 98720 /98767
- ^{1} French Land Register data, which excludes lakes, ponds, glaciers > 1 km^{2} (0.386 sq mi or 247 acres) and river estuaries.

Hao, or Haorangi, is a large coral atoll in the central part of the Tuamotu Archipelago. It has c. 1000 people living on 35 km^{2} (14 sq mi). It was used to house the military support base for the nuclear tests on Mururoa. Because of its shape, French explorer Louis Antoine de Bougainville named it "Île de la Harpe" (Harp Island).

== Geography ==
Hao is 920 km (570 mi) east of Tahiti. It is 50 km (31 mi) long and 14 km (8.7 mi) wide. The lagoon is the fourth largest atoll in French Polynesia (after Rangiroa, Fakarava, and Makemo) and has only one navigable passage, at Kaki, on the north end of the atoll where strong currents prevail up to 20 knots with bores. The lagoon covers an area of 720 km^{2}.

The climate is maritime, with temperatures oscillating between 23 and 32 °C throughout the year.

The chief town is the village of Otepa, where the main economic activity is the cultivation of pearls.

== Demography ==
The main village is Otepa, and the population was 1,066 inhabitants in the 2012 census, with a strong demographic increase since the establishment of the Pacific Experimentation Center (CEP) base for nuclear testing. However, in the last census conducted in 2022, a slight drop in the number of settlers is noted, reaching 1,009 people.

=== Religion ===
Most of the population of the Atoll follow Christianity as a result of the missionary activity of both Catholic and Protestant groups and French colonization. The Catholic Church began its activity in the region in the 19th century and has a religious building in the area called St. Peter's Church (Église de Saint-Pierre), located in Otepa, the largest town on the island and attached to the Metropolitan Archdiocese of Papeete with headquarters on the island of Tahiti.

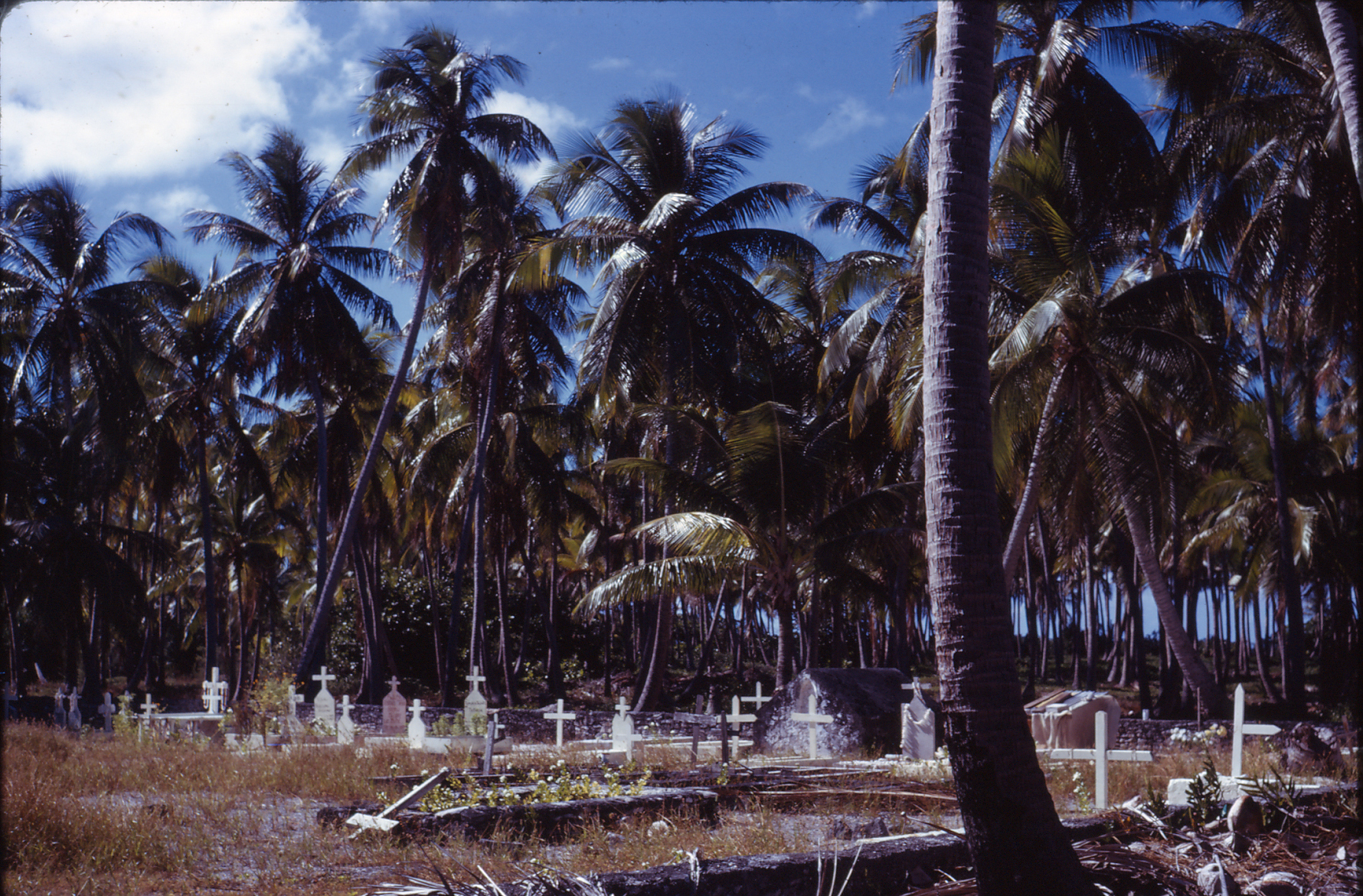
Hao cemetery

== History ==
The first recorded European arriving on Hao was Pedro Fernández de Quirós on 10 February 1606. He named it Conversion de San Pablo. He was followed by José Andía y Varela in 1774.

Because of its shape, French explorer Louis Antoine de Bougainville named it "Île de la Harpe" (Harp Island). In some maps it also appears as Bow Island.

Hao was the first atoll of the Tuamotus that Russian explorer Fabian Gottlieb von Bellingshausen visited in 1820 on the ships Vostok and Mirni.

In the late-1980s, two French intelligence (DGSE) operatives were briefly confined to the military base on the island after France obtained their release from a New Zealand prison for sinking the Greenpeace ship Rainbow Warrior. Their earlier-than-agreed-upon repatriation from the island by the French government became a diplomatic incident between New Zealand and France.

Hao's military airfield, now known as Hao Airport, was transferred to the civilian authorities in 2000. This airport (IATA: HOI, ICAO: NTTO) serves many of the smaller eastern Tuamotus, whose landing strips are too short to land aircraft large enough to make the flight to Tahiti. Its 3.46 km (2.15 mi) runway was to be a designated Transoceanic abort landing sites for the Space Shuttle, had it taken on flight operation from the Vandenberg launch facility, which never came to be.

The economic future of the atoll remains in question: the military base, which was the support base for nuclear testing on the nearby Mururoa atoll, was permanently shut down in 2002, along with its many support facilities, including the electrical and desalinization plants and the hospital. The livelihood of many of the atoll's inhabitants was directly tied to the military base.

== Administration ==
Together with 11 other islands, Hao forms the commune of Hao, which is part of the administrative subdivision of Îles Tuamotu-Gambier. The seat of the commune is the village Otepa. The commune consists of three associated communes: Hao (including the uninhabited islands Ahunui, Nengonengo, Manuhangi and Paraoa), Amanu (including the uninhabited islands Rekareka and Tauere) and Hereheretue (including the uninhabited islands Anuanuraro and Anuanurunga and the inhabited island Nukutepipi). As of the 2022 census, the commune's total population was 1,227.

== Climate ==
Climate data for Hao (1991–2020 normals)
Month	Jan	Feb	Mar	Apr	May	Jun	Jul	Aug	Sep	Oct	Nov	Dec	Year
Mean daily maximum °C (°F)	29.6 (85.3)	29.8 (85.6)	30.3 (86.5)	29.7 (85.5)	28.9 (84.0)	27.9 (82.2)	27.3 (81.1)	27.2 (81.0)	27.5 (81.5)	28.1 (82.6)	28.9 (84.0)	29.3 (84.7)	28.7 (83.7)
Daily mean °C (°F)	27.5 (81.5)	27.6 (81.7)	28.1 (82.6)	27.6 (81.7)	27.0 (80.6)	26.0 (78.8)	25.4 (77.7)	25.2 (77.4)	25.4 (77.7)	25.9 (78.6)	26.8 (80.2)	27.2 (81.0)	26.6 (79.9)
Mean daily minimum °C (°F)	25.4 (77.7)	25.5 (77.9)	26.0 (78.8)	25.6 (78.1)	25.0 (77.0)	24.1 (75.4)	23.5 (74.3)	23.3 (73.9)	23.3 (73.9)	23.8 (74.8)	24.6 (76.3)	25.1 (77.2)	24.6 (76.3)
Average precipitation mm (inches)	162.5 (6.40)	158.5 (6.24)	108.4 (4.27)	127.1 (5.00)	110.4 (4.35)	101.6 (4.00)	75.1 (2.96)	56.6 (2.23)	83.0 (3.27)	109.8 (4.32)	117.5 (4.63)	171.6 (6.76)	1,382.1 (54.41)
Average precipitation days (≥ 1.0 mm)	14.9	12.3	11.1	11.6	10.6	10.3	9.8	7.3	7.8	10.0	10.7	12.6	129.1
Source: World Meteorological Organization

== Transport ==
Hao Airport (IATA: HOI, ICAO: NTTO) is in the island's north. It is used as a base by Air Tahiti, the domestic airline of French Polynesia.

== Economy ==
During the 1960s, the Pacific Experimental Center base generated most of the atoll's economic activity. The infrastructures built during these years are numerous: a major airfield with a 3,380 m runway (classified by NASA as an emergency landing strip in case of a technical problem with the space shuttle Columbia), a cargo port, a 15 km road, desalination units, electric generators and a hospital.

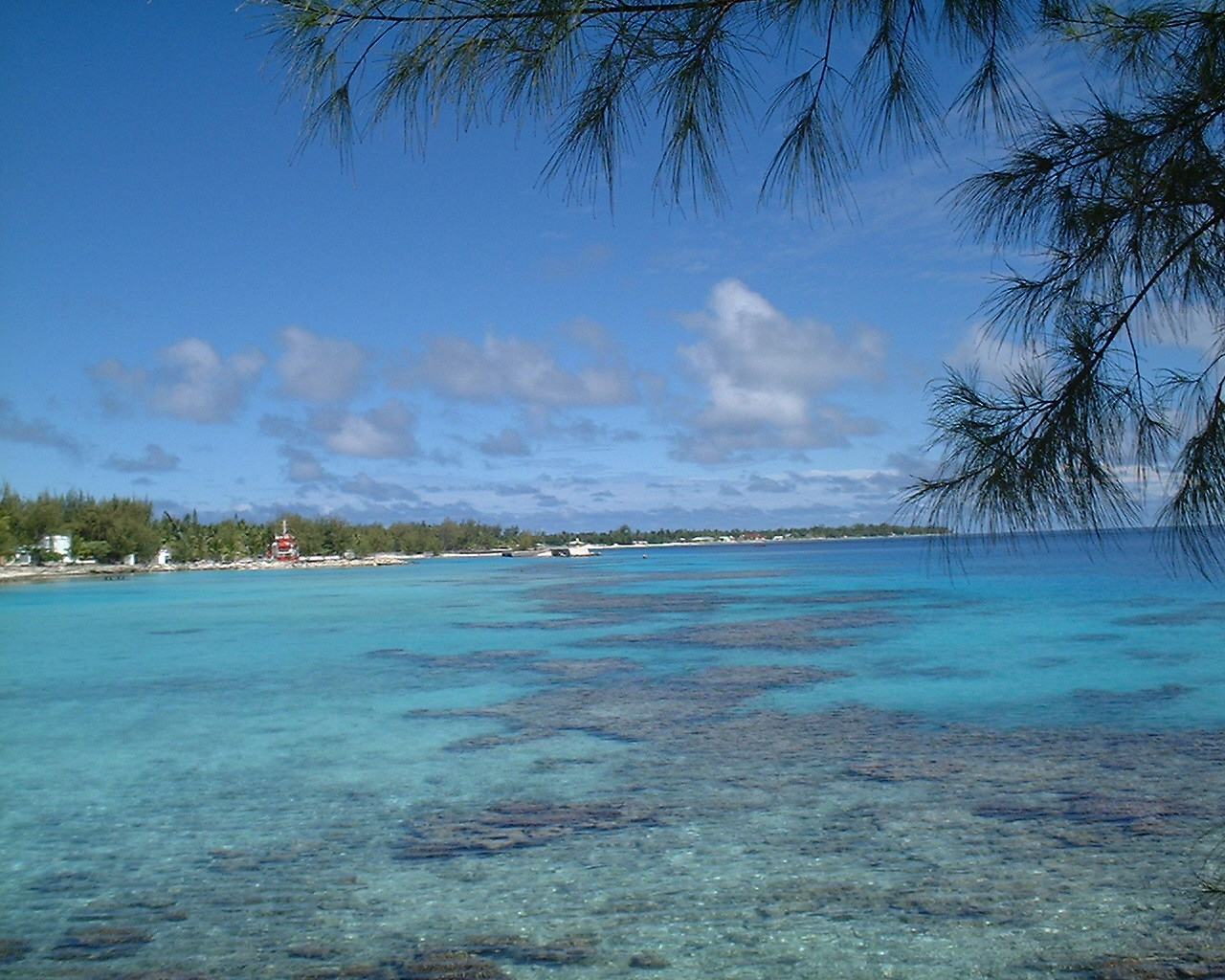
View of Hao Atoll

=== Fishing, pearl farming and aquaculture ===
Since 2000, the atoll's private sector activities have been mainly related to pearl farming, fishing (with the export to Tahiti of about ten tons of seafood per year) and copra harvesting.

On August 23, 2017, Chinese businessman Wang Cheng, chairman of Tahiti Nui Ocean Foods, announced in Papeete his intention to invest €1.3 billion ($1.5 billion) to create an aquaculture farm on Hao that could produce up to 50.000 tons per year of lagoon fish (mainly groupers and humphead wrasse, but also sea cucumbers) for export. The French Polynesian government supports the project, which has been five years in the making, and which, according to its promoter, should allow the theoretical creation of nearly three hundred jobs during the thirty months of construction, and five hundred jobs (90% of which should be attributed to Polynesians) from the start of operations, allowing the diversification of the economic activity of the atoll, depopulated since the withdrawal of the French army. Some earthworks were carried out in March 2018, but the works, which were to be completed in 2020, are regularly postponed.

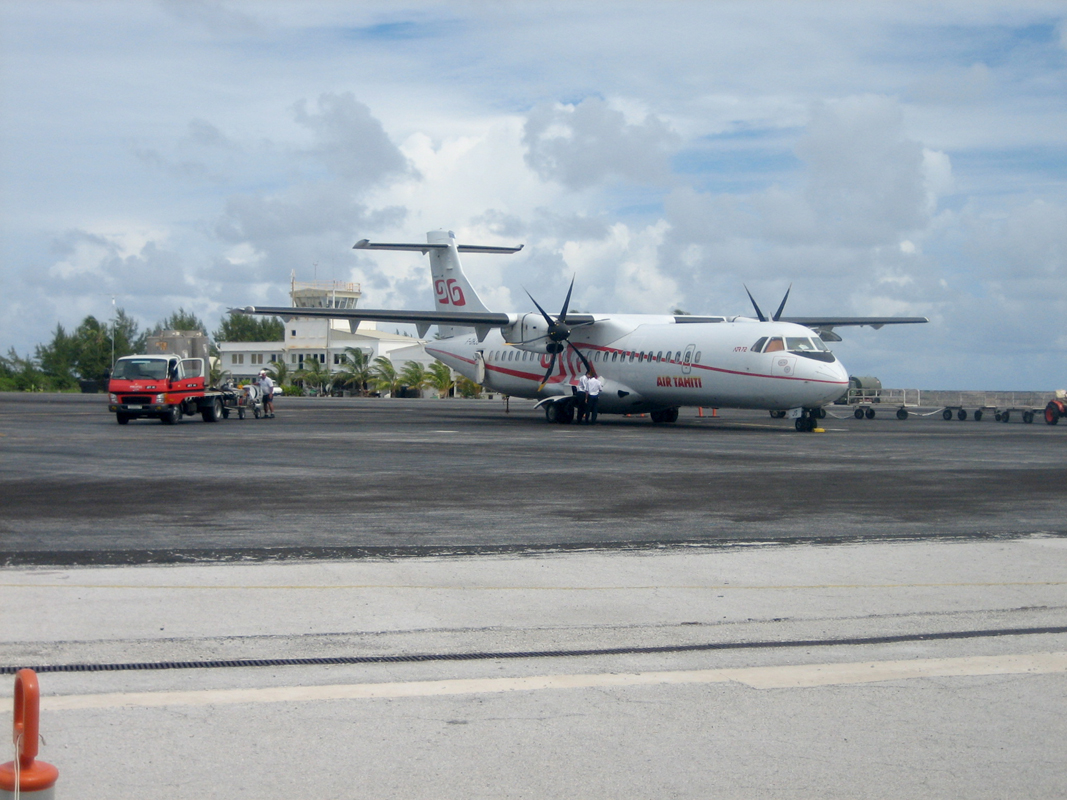
Hao Airport

On the one hand, many questions are being raised about the environmental impact of the project, which is causing concern among many elected representatives. In addition, on February 25, 2020, the director of the company in charge of the work was given a three-year suspended prison sentence for forgery. In December 2019, Wang Cheng was heard by investigators under the open hearing system as part of a preliminary investigation into suspicions of "abuse of social assets" initiated in January 2019 by the investigation section (SR) of the Papeete gendarmerie.

=== Tertiary sector and public services ===
Hao airfield hosts, on average, about 800 flights and between 12 and 15,000 passengers per year, 30% of whom are in transit.

The municipality also hosts a secondary school for the children of the southern Tuamotu and Gambier atolls, as well as, for the past few years, the Center for Education in Appropriate Technologies for Development (CETAD), a vocational training institute specialized in sea-related professions. Most of the teachers come from metropolitan France for a period of two to four years.

Hao acquired a modern desalination plant in 2005. Electricity is permanently supplied by generators (EDT-ELECTRA). In 2006, the municipality was equipped with street lighting powered by two wind turbines and solar panels. Finally, the landing of the Natitua submarine cable and its commissioning in December 2018 allows Hao to be connected to Tahiti and to the global high-speed Internet.

== See also ==
- French Polynesia
